= Strategies Against Architecture III =

Compilation album by Einstürzende Neubauten
- Released: October 23, 2001
- Recorded: 1991–2001
- Genre: Experimental rock Industrial rock Avant-garde; Dark ambient
- Length: 125:30
- Label: Mute

Einstürzende Neubauten chronology
Silence Is Sexy (2000)	Strategies Against Architecture III (2001)	Supporter Album No. 1 (2002)

Professional ratings
Review scores
Source	Rating
Allmusic	4/5 stars

Strategies Against Architecture III (Strategien gegen Architektur III) (1991-2001, double CD) is an album by Einstürzende Neubauten and was released in 2001.

This album featured a retrospective overview of the previous decade of the band's music. It is the third Einstürzende Neubauten release of this type, preceded by Strategies Against Architecture II (1991) and Strategies Against Architecture 80-83 (1984).

== Track listing ==
=== Disc one ===
1. "Zentrifuge" (4:48)
2. "12305(te Nacht)" (4:11)
3. "Für Wen Sind Die Blumen?" (4:24)
4. "Redukt" (9:40) (live)
5. "Ende Neu" (6:19) (live)
6. "Blume" (4:30) (French version)
7. "Three Thoughts (Devil's Sect)" (4:37)
8. "Implosion" (1:32)
9. "Scampi Alla Carlina" (2:45)
10. "Snake" (3:35)
11. "Alles Was Irgendwie Nützt" (8:08) (live)
12. "The Garden" (5:13)
13. "Anrufe In Abwesenheit" (4:18)
14. "Querulanten" (0:58)

=== Disc two ===
1. "Architektur Ist Geiselnahme" (5:04)
2. "Helium" (3:12)
3. "Wüste" (3:49) (ballet version)
4. "Der Leere Raum" (1:59)
5. "Was Ist Ist" (4:17) (extended version)
6. "I Wish This Would Be Your Colour" (8:11) (live)
7. "Bili Rubin" (3:00)
8. "Die Interimsliebenden" (7:16)
9. "Installation Nr. 1 (John Is Mixing)" (3:46)
10. "Montblanc" (0:29)
11. "Open Fire" (4:28)
12. "Salamandrina" (2:59)
13. "Letztes Bild" (3:54)
14. "Silence Is Sexy" (6:00)
15. "Drachen" (2:07)

== Personnel ==
- Blixa Bargeld - lead vocals, guitars, keyboards
- Marc Chung - bass, vocals
- Jochen Arbeit - guitar, vocals
- Alexander Hacke - guitar, bass, vocals
- N.U. Unruh - percussion, vocals
- F.M. Einheit - percussion, vocals
- Rudolph Moser - percussion, vocals
- Anita Lane - lead vocals on "Blume"
