= Haus der Lüge =

Studio album by Einstürzende Neubauten
- Released: 4 September 1989
- Recorded: 1988–1989
- Genre: Industrial rock; electro-industrial
- Length: 34:22
- Label: Some Bizzare
- Producer: Einstürzende Neubauten

Einstürzende Neubauten chronology
Fünf auf der nach oben offenen Richterskala (1987)	Haus der Lüge (1989)	Tabula Rasa (1993)

Singles from Haus der Lüge
- 1. "Feurio!" Released: March 1990

Haus der Lüge (English: House of Lies) is the fifth full-length studio release by the German band Einstürzende Neubauten, released in 1989 by Rough Trade Records. It was reissued in 2002 by Some Bizzare Records in the U.K., the band's own label Potomak in Europe and Thirsty Ear Recordings in the U.S.

== Reception ==
Professional ratings
Review scores
Source	Rating
AllMusic	4.5/5 stars

Trouser Press described Haus der Lüge as "a much stronger album than Fuenf." According to Ned Raggett of AllMusic, the album "[finds] the group wrapping up [the] decade on a high note".

== Track listing ==
1. "Prolog" - 1:50
2. "Feurio!" - 6:02
3. "Ein Stuhl in der Hölle" ("A Chair in Hell") - 2:09
4. "Haus der Lüge" ("House of Lies") - 4:00
5. "Epilog" - 0:28 (indexed as part of track 4 on some releases)
6. "Fiat Lux" - 12:24
  a) "Fiat Lux" ("Let There be Light")
  b) "Maifestspiele" ("May Festival")
  c) "Hirnlego" ("Brainlego")
7. "Schwindel" ("Deception") - 3:58
8. "Der Kuss" ("The Kiss") - 3:37

Reissue bonus tracks ("Feurio!" single B-sides):

1. "Feurio! (Remix)" - 4:47
2. "Partymucke" ("Party Music") - 3:52
3. "Feurio! (Türen Offen)" ("Feurio! (Doors Open)") - 4:47

== Personnel ==
Einstürzende Neubauten

- Blixa Bargeld - guitar, lead vocals
- Mark Chung - bass, backing vocals
- Alexander Hacke - guitar, backing vocals
- N.U. Unruh - percussion, backing vocals
- F.M. Einheit - percussion, backing vocals

"Partymucke" was originally written for Peter Zadek's play Andi.

The Maifestspiele section of "Fiat Lux" contains field recordings from a demonstration in Kreuzberg, Berlin on 1 May 1987.

"Ein Stuhl in der Hölle" and the "Hirnlego" section of "Fiat Lux" were later included on the 1991 compilation Strategies Against Architecture II.

== Notes ==
The cover art is based on a woodcut titled "Group of Six Horses" by German Renaissance artist Hans Baldung Grien.
