= Strategies Against Architecture '80–'83 =

Compilation album of live tracks & B-sides by Einstürzende Neubauten
- Released: 1984
- Recorded: 1980–1983
- Genre: Industrial, noise
- Length: 41:17
- Label: Mute
- Producer: Einstürzende Neubauten

Einstürzende Neubauten chronology
Zeichnungen des Patienten O. T. (1983)	Strategies Against Architecture '80–'83 (1984)	Halber Mensch (1985)

Professional ratings
Review scores
Source	Rating
AllMusic	4.5/5 stars

Strategies Against Architecture '80–'83, also spelled 80–83 Strategies Against Architecture (German:80–83 Strategien gegen Architekturen), is a 1984 compilation album by the German industrial band Einstürzende Neubauten. It consists of material recorded from 1980 to 1983, and features roughly half of the band's debut 1981 LP Kollaps along with single-only tracks and live material. It was originally released on Mute Records and is currently being sold without authority by Rough Trade. The compilation's artwork was re-used by fellow labelmates Liars for their second album's 2004 single There's Always Room on the Broom.

== Track listing ==
1. "Tanz Debil" - 3:20 (A Dance of Mental Illness)
2. "Schmerzen hören" (Hören Mit Schmerzen) - 2:31 (Listen with Pain)
3. "Mikroben" - 1:31 (Microbes)
4. "Krieg in den Städten" - 3:44 (War in the Cities) (originally Steh auf Berlin)
5. "Zum Tier machen" - 3:05 (Changing to Animal)
6. "Draußen ist feindlich" - 0:48 (Outside is Hostile)
7. "Stahlversion" - 5:35 (Steel Version)
8. "Schwarz" - 4:16 (Black)
9. "Negativ nein" - 2:23 (Negative No)
10. "Kalte Sterne" - 4:11 (Cold Stars)
11. "Spaltung" - 2:25 (Split)
12. "U-Haft Muzak" - 3:41 (Muzak for While on Remand)
13. "Gestohlenes Band (ORF)" - 0:17 (Tape Stolen in ORF)
14. "Schwarz (mutiert)" - 3:26 (Black (Mutated))

== Personnel ==
Einstürzende Neubauten

- Blixa Bargeld - lead vocals, guitars
- Mark Chung - bass, vocals
- Alexander Hacke - guitar, vocals
- N.U. Unruh - percussion, vocals
- F.M. Einheit - percussion, vocals

with:

- Jim Thirlwell - compilation assistance
