= Tabula Rasa (Einstürzende Neubauten album) =

Studio album by Einstürzende Neubauten
- Released: 1993
- Recorded: 1990–1992
- Genre: Industrial
- Length: 45:14
- Label: Mute
- Producer: Einstürzende Neubauten, Jon Caffery

Einstürzende Neubauten chronology
Haus der Lüge (1989)	Tabula Rasa (1993)	Ende Neu (1996)

Tabula Rasa is the sixth full-length studio album by the German industrial band Einstürzende Neubauten, released in 1993 through Mute Records worldwide and through the band's own label Potomak in Germany, Austria and Switzerland.

Anita Lane joins Blixa Bargeld on vocals for the song "Blume."

== Reception ==
Professional ratings
Review scores
Source	Rating
AllMusic	3/5 stars

Trouser Press described the album as "a gripping blend of stately seduction and brutality that sounds like the masterpiece Einstürzende Neubauten was born to make."

== Track listing ==
All songs written and arranged by Blixa Bargeld, Mark Chung, F. M. Einheit, Alexander Hacke and N. U. Unruh, copyright Freibank Music.

1. "Die Interimsliebenden" ("The Interim Lovers") - 7:41
2. "Zebulon" - 3:43
3. "Blume" ("Flower") - 4:33
4. "12305(te Nacht)" ("12305th Night") - 4:13
5. "Sie" (She) - 6:08
6. "Wüste" ("Desert") - 4:07
7. "Headcleaner" - 9:55
  I. "Zentrifuge" / "Stabs" / "Rotlichtachse" / "Propaganda" / "Aufmarsch" ("Centrifuge" / "Stabs" / "Red Light Axis" / "Propaganda" / "Deployment")
  II. "Einhorn" ("Unicorn")
  III. "Marschlied" ("Marching Song")
8. "Headcleaner" - 5:12
  "Das Gleissen / Schlacht" ("The Glare / Battle")
  IV. "Lyrischer Rückzug" ("Lyric Retreat")

"Marschlied" contains a sample of, and interpolates modified lyrics from, the Beatles song "All You Need Is Love", changing the refrain to: "All you need is headcleaner."

== Personnel ==
Einstürzende Neubauten

- Blixa Bargeld - lead vocals
- Alexander Hacke - guitar, backing vocals
- F. M. Einheit - percussion, backing vocals, keyboards
- Mark Chung - bass, backing vocals
- N. U. Unruh - percussion, backing vocals

== Production ==
- Produced by E. N. & Jon Caffery
- Recorded and engineered by Jon Caffery and Boris Wilsdorf
- Mixed by Jon Caffery
