= Some Bizzare Records discography =

The following list details the discography of the British independent record label, Some Bizzare Records. The label is notable for hosting such artists as Soft Cell, The The and Marc Almond. The discography is broken down into different media type sections.

== Vinyl ==
=== 7" singles ===
- BART 451: Einstürzende Neubauten - Das Schaben (1985)
- BZS 2 : Soft Cell - Tainted Love
- BZS 4 : The The - Cold Spell Ahead
- BZS 6 : Soft Cell - Bedsitter
- BZS 7 : Soft Cell - Say Hello, Wave Goodbye
- BZS 8 : B-Movie - Nowhere Girl
- BZS 9 : Soft Cell - Torch
- BZS 11 : Soft Cell - What!
- BZS 16 : Soft Cell - Where the Heart is
- BZS 17 : Soft Cell - Numbers
- BZS 19 : Marc and the Mambas - Black Heart
- BZS 20 : Soft Cell - Soul Inside
- BZS 22 : Soft Cell - Down in the Subway
- BZS 23 : Marc Almond - The Boy Who Came Back
- BZS 24 : Marc Almond - You Have
- BZS 25 : Marc Almond - Tenderness Is A Weakness
- EPC A2787 : The The - Uncertain Smile (1982 Some Bizzare / Epic)
- EPC A3119 : The The - Perfect (Some Bizzare / Epic)
- EPC A3588 : The The - Uncertain Smile (1983 Some Bizzare / Epic)
- EPC A3710 : The The - This is the Day (Some Bizzare / Epic)
- HARD 1 : Soft Cell - Memorabilia
- SBZ 016 : The The - Cold Spell Ahead (Re-released)
- SBZ 7002 : Stex - Still Feel the Rain

=== 10" singles ===
- BIZ DJ 4 : Bizarre Inc - Keep The Music Strong (Promo) (1996)
- BIZ DJ 7 : Bizarre Inc - Surprise (Promo) (1996)
- BZS 2510 : Marc Almond - Tenderness is a Weakness (1984)

=== 12" singles ===
Guy Chambers started with a band called ‘The Burmoe Brothers’ releasing their first single, featuring Marc Almond "Skin" on Some Bizzare Records in 1984

- 12 R 6260 : Tim Hutton - Third Star (Promo) (1990)
- BART 12 : Einstürzende Neubauten - Yu-Güng (1985)
- BIZ DJ 1 : Bizarre Inc - Keep The Music Strong (MAW Mixes Promo) (1996)
- BIZ DJ 3 : Bizarre Inc - Keep The Music Strong (Promo) (1996)
- BIZ DJ 5 : Bizarre Inc - Surprise (Promo) (1996)
- BIZ DJ 6 : Bizarre Inc - Surprise (Promo) (1996)
- BIZ DJ 8 : Bizarre Inc - (Get Up) Sunshine Street (Promo) (1996)
- BIZ DJ 9 : Bizarre Inc - (Get Up) Sunshine Street (Promo) (1996)
- BIZE 1/2 : Bizarre Inc - Keep the Music Strong (1996)
- BZS 112 : Soft Cell - What!
- BZS 212 : Soft Cell - Tainted Love
- BZS 512 : Marc and the Mambas - Sleaze (Take It, Shake It) (1982)
- BZS 612 : Soft Cell - Bedsitter
- BZS 712 : Soft Cell - Say Hello, Wave Goodbye
- BZS 912 : Soft Cell - Torch (1982)
- BZS 1612 : Soft Cell - Where the Heart is
- BZS 1712 : Soft Cell - Numbers
- BZS 2012 : Soft Cell - Soul Inside
- BZS 2212 : Soft Cell - Down in the Subway
- BZS 2312 : Marc Almond - The Boy Who Came Back (1984)
- BZS 2412 : Marc Almond - You Have (1984)
- BZSR 2212 : Soft Cell - Down in the Subway (Remix)
- BZZX 8 : B-Movie - Nowhere Girl (1982)
- EPC A13 2787 : The The - Uncertain Smile (1982 Some Bizzare / Epic)
- EPC A13 3119 : The The - Perfect (1983 Some Bizzare / Epic)
- EPC TA 3588 : The The - Uncertain Smile (1983 Some Bizzare / Epic)
- EPC TA 3710 : The The - This is the Day(1983 Some Bizzare / Epic)
- HARD 12 : Soft Cell - Memorabilia (1981)
- RD4 : Renaldo & the Loaf - Hambu Hodo (1986)
- SBZ 050 : Meka - High Heeled Shoes (Yer Man Mix)
- SBZ 090 : The Grid - Put Your Hands Together (2008)
- SBZ 112 : Pedro INF - 12" Sampler (2008)
- SBZ 12 001 : FM Einheit - Fruehlingserwachen (Spring Awakening) (1990)
- SBZ 12 002 : Stex - Still Feel the Rain (1990)
- SBZ 12 013 : Unmen - The Unsleep (1992)
- SBZ 12 014 : Foreheads in a Fishtank - Haircut (1992)
- SBZ 12 018 : Vertigo - Beneath the Sheets (1993)
- SBZ 12 019 : Vertigo - All of Me (1993)
- SBZ 12 024 : Messiah - Let Tyrants Tremble (1997)
- SBZX 016 : The The - Cold Spell Ahead
- SLUT 1 : Slut - Flesh Volcano (1987)
- TEST 112 : Test Dept - Compulsion (1983)
- TEST 2-3 : Test Dept - Beating the Retreat (Box Set) (1984)
- THIEF 5 : Tim Hutton - The Prophet (1992)
- TRUTH T2 : The The - Heartland (1986)
- WOMB UNC 7.12 : Foetus Über Frisco - Finely Honed Machine (Some Bizzare / Self Immolation 1985)
- WOMB FAT 11.12 : Foetus Art Terrorism - Calamity Crush (Some Bizzare / Self Immolation 1984)
- WOMB FGH 8.12 : You've Got Foetus On Your Breath - Wash / Slog (Some Bizzare / Self Immolation 1985)

=== Albums ===
- EPC 25525 : The The - Soul Mining (1983 Some Bizzare / Some Bizzare Epic)
- BART 331 : Einstürzende Neubauten - Halber Mensch (1985)
- BART 332 : Einstürzende Neubauten - Five on the Open-ended Richter Scale(1987)
- BART 333 : Einstürzende Neubauten - Haus der Lüge (1989)
- BIZLP 01 : Various - Some Bizzare Album
- BIZLP 02 : Soft Cell - Non-Stop Erotic Cabaret
- BIZL 3 : Soft Cell - The Art of Falling Apart
- BIZL 4 : Marc and the Mambas - Torment and Toreros (1983)
- BIZL 5 : Dave Ball - In Strict Tempo
- BIZL 6 : Soft Cell - This Last Night in Sodom
- BIZL 8 : Marc Almond and the Willing Sinners - Vermin in Ermine (1984)
- BREL 1 : Marc Almond - Jacques (1989)
- BZLP 01 : Various Artists - Some Bizzare Album (1981)
- BZLP 02 : Soft Cell - Non-Stop Erotic Cabaret (1981)
- BZLP 03 : Soft Cell - The Singles (1986)
- SBVART 2 : Einstürzende Neubauten - Drawings of Patient O.T. (1983)
- SBZLP 001 : Various - If You Can't Please Yourself, You Can't Please Your Soul (1985)
- SBZLP 002 : Vicious Circle - Barbed Wire Slides
- SBZLP 003 : Various - ish (1990)
- SBZLP 006 : FM Einheit - Stein
- SBZLP 021 : Marc Almond - Absinthe
- VBO-1-3313 : Soft Cell - Non Stop Ecstatic Dancing (1982 Some Bizzare / Vertigo)
- WOMB FDL 3 : Scraping Foetus Off The Wheel - Hole (Some Bizzare / Self Immolation 1984)
- WOMB FIP 4 : Scraping Foetus Off The Wheel - Nail (Some Bizzare / Self Immolation 1985)

== Compact disc ==
=== CD singles ===
- SBZ 019CD : Vertigo - All Of Me (1993)
- SBZ 024CD : Progenitor - Let Tyrants Tremble (1997)
- SBZ 039CD : Koot - Dentists Chair (2001)
- SBZ 044CD : Egill - You Are My Loving Insane (2001)
- SBZ 045CD : The Droidz - Standing on my Own (2001)
- CDR 6186 : Marc Almond - Tears Run Rings (1988 Some Bizzare/Parlophone)
- CDR 6194 : Marc Almond - Bitter Sweet (1988 Some Bizzare/Parlophone)
- CDR 6206 : Zeke Manyika - Runaway Freedom Train (Some Bizzare/Parlophone)
- CDR 6210 : Marc Almond - Only the Moment (Some Bizzare/Parlophone)
- CDR 6252 : Marc Almond - The Desperate Hours (Some Bizzare/Parlophone)
- CD THE 2 : The The - Sweet Bird of Truth (1987 Some Bizzare / Epic)
- MERCD 451 : Bizarre Inc - Keep the Music Strong (Some Bizzare/Mercury)
- MERCD 471 : Bizarre Inc - Get up Sunshine Street (Some Bizzare/Mercury)
- SBZ 12 002 CD : Stex - Still Feel the Rain
- YZ 633CD : Marc Almond - My Hand Over my Heart (Some Bizzare/WEA)

=== CD albums ===
Soft Cell - Non Stop Erotic Cabaret Film (DVD)

The The Soul Mining

The The Infected the movie The The Infected the album The The Mind Bomb The The Dusk The The Hanky Panky The The "Best Of"

Test Dept & the South Wales Striking Miners Choir - Comrades in arms

Test Dept A Good Night Out

The Champagne Kinder garden I want to marry harry when I have grown up

Agnes Bernelle Mother the Wardrobe Is Full of infantrymen

Coil Scatology CD Enhanced Coil Horse Rotorvator

Marc Almond & The Willing Sinners (Live In Berlin) [DVD] Marc Almond in Session Volume 1 (2003, BBC/Strange Fruit) Marc Almond in Session Volume 2 (2003, BBC/Strange Fruit) Three Black Nights of Little Black Bites (2012, Cherry Red Records) (as Marc and the Mambas)

Marc Almond Twelve Years of Tears (Live at the Royal Albert Hall) (1993, WEA)

Soft Cell at the B.B.C July 26, 1981 - June 1, 1983 The first five tracks are from the Richard Skinner show on 26 July 1981, the last three are from the David Jensen show on 6 January 1983. The CD also contains video footage of Soft Cell performing 'Youth' and 'Sex Dwarf' live on the Old Grey Whistle Test programme recorded on 4 February 1982. Released October 14, 2003

Swans Public Castration Is a Good Idea

- SBZ 001CD : Various - If You Can't Please Yourself, You Can't Please Your Soul
- SBZ 003CD : Various - ish (1990)
- SBZ 004CD : Stex - Spiritual Dance (1992)
- SBZ 005CD : Tim Hutton - The Conscious Kind (1991)
- SBZ 006CD : FM Einheit - Stein (1990)
- SBZ 011CD : Psychic TV - Dreams Less Sweet Some Bizzare Sony
- SBZ 016CD : The The - Cold Spell Ahead EP (1992)
- SBZ 018CD : Vertigo - Beneath the Sheets
- SBZ 021CD : Marc Almond - Absinthe (1993)
- SBZ 022CD : Marc Almond & Foetus - Violent Silence / Flesh Volcano (1997)
- SBZ 023CD : Test Dept - Beating the Retreat CD Enhanced
- SBZ 025CD : Progenitor - Wise Without Eyes (1997)
- SBZ 026CD : Psychic TV - Force the Hand of Chance (1997)Some Bizzare Warner CD Enhanced
- SBZ 027CD : Marc and the Mambas - Untitled Some Bizzare/Universal)CD Enhanced
- SBZ 028CD : Marc and the Mambas - Torment & Toreos Some Bizzare/Universal)
- SBZ 029CD : Marc Almond - Virmin in Ermine Some Bizzare/Universal)CD Enhanced
- SBZ 030CD : Marc Almond - Stories of Johnny (1997)CD Enhanced
- SBZ 031CD : Marc Almond & The Willing Sinners - Mother Fist & Her Five Daughters CD Enhanced
- SBZ 032CD : Marc Almond - A Virgins Tale Vol 1 CD Enhanced
- SBZ 033CD : Marc Almond - A Virgins Tale Vol 2 (1997)CD Enhanced
- SBZ 034CD : Marc Almond & Foetus - Flesh Volcano / Slut (1997)
- SBZ 035CD : Marc Almond - Violent Silence / A Woman's Story
- SBZ 036CD : Renaldo and the Loaf - The Elbow is Taboo
- SBZ 037CD : Marc Almond & La Magia - Live in Concert
- SBZ 038CD : Kai Motta - Picture That (2001)CD Enhanced
- SBZ 040CD : Koot - Skyjacked (2001)CD Enhanced
- SBZ 041CD : Egill - Tonk of the Lawn (2001)CD Enhanced
- SBZ 042CD : Various - I'd Rather Shout at a Returning Echo than Kid Someone's Listening (2001)CD Enhanced
- SBZ 046CD : Soft Cell - The Bedsit Tapes (2005)
- SBZ 047CD : Swans - Cop / Young God / Greed / Holy Money (2005)

Irked E.P Flat Stanley/Sonnenstrah [1998 CD Enhanced ]

- SBZ 048CD : Meka - High Heel Shoes
- SBZ 049CD : Mainstream Distortion - Bully (2006)CD Enhanced
- SBZ 051CD : Monkey Farm Frankenstein - Twitch of the Def Nerve (2006)
- SBZ 052CD : Scraping Foetus of the Wheel - Hole
- SBZ 053CD : Scraping Foetus of the Wheel - Nail
- SBZ 054CD : Foetus Interruptus - Thaw

Einstürzende Neubauten Roar Records Einstürzende Neubauten - Halber Mensch Film DVD

- SBZ 055CD : Einstürzende Neubauten - Halber Mensch
- SBZ 056CD : Einstürzende Neubauten - Drawings of Patient O.T.
- SBZ 057CD : Einstürzende Neubauten - Five on the Open-ended Richter Scale
- SBZ 058CD : Einstürzende Neubauten - Haus der Lüge
- SBZ 059CD : Soft Cell - Demo Non Stop
- SBZ 060CD : Psychic TV - Force the Hand of Chance / Themes (CD Re-issue)Some Bizzare Warner
- SBZ 061CD : Psychic TV - Dreams Less Sweet (CD Re-issue)Some Bizzare Sony
- SBZ 064CD : Test Dept - The Unacceptable Face of Freedom
- SBZ 065CD : Test Dept - Beating a Retreat CD Enhanced
- SBZ 067CD : Marc and the Mambas - Untitled (2008 Re-issue)Some Bizzare/Universal)CD Enhanced
- SBZ 068CD : Marc Almond - Vermin in Ermine (2008 Re-issue)Some Bizzare/Universal)CD Enhanced
- SBZ 069CD : Marc and the Mambas - Torment & Toreros (2008 Re-issue) Some Bizzare/Universal)
- SBZ 071CD : Marc Almond - A Virgins Tale Vol 1 & 2 (2008 Re-issue)CD Enhanced
- SBZ 074CD : Foetus Inc - Sink
- SBZ 075CD : Dave Ball - In Strict Tempo (2008 Re-issue)
- SBZ 076CD : ZGA Vs Figs - Who has Stolen the Air? (2008)
- SBZ 079CD : Pedro INF - pedro inf (2008)
- SBZ 080CD : First Aid 4 Souls - My Favourite Pain
- SBZ 081CD : Kontour - Scanners (2008)
- SBZ 082CD : Gary Lucas Vs The Dark Poets - Beyond the Pale (2008)
- SBZ 092CD : Risqué - Tie Me Up Tie Me Down CD Enhanced
- SBZ 093CD : The Grid - Doppelganger (2008)
- SBZ 099CD : Various - Some Bizzare Double Album (2008)
- SBZ 101CD : Various - Some Bizzare Album (2008 Re-issue)CD Enhanced
- SBZ 105CD : Lucid Sketchmaster - The Seed (2008)
- SBZ 110CD : GL1TCHG0R3 - Gearball (2008)
- SBZ 113CD : Marc Almond - Absinthe (2008 Re-issue)
- SBZ 114CD : Marc Almond - Jacques (2008 Re-issue)
- SBZ CD115 : Pedro INF - Azphonix (2010)
- SBZ CD116 : Satanicpornocultshop - Arkhaiomelisidonophunikheratos (2010)
- BART 331 CD : Einstürzende Neubauten - Halber Mensch (1986)
- BART 332 CD : Einstürzende Neubauten - Five on the Open-ended Richter Scale
- BART 333 CD : Einstürzende Neubauten - Haus der Lüge (1989)
- BREL 1 CD : Marc Almond - Jacques (1989)
- CD FAITH 1 : Marc Almond - Stories of Johnny (1985 Some Bizzare/Virgin)
- CD FAITH 2 : Marc Almond & The Willing Sinners - Mother Fist & Her Five Daughters (1987 Some Bizzare/Virgin)
- CD FAITH 3 : Marc Almond - Singles 1984 - 1987 (Some Bizzare/Virgin)
- CV CD1 : Cabaret Voltaire - The Crackdown (1983 Some Bizzare/Virgin)
- CV CD2 : Cabaret Voltaire - Micro-Phonies (1984 Some Bizzare/Virgin)
- CV CD3 : Cabaret Voltaire - The Covenant, The Sword and the Arm of the Lord (1985 Some Bizzare/Virgin)

Cabaret Voltaire - Conform to deform Some Bizzare/Virgin)

Cabaret Voltaire - Gasoline in your eyes Some Bizzare/Virgin) ANNIE HOGAN Plays Kickabye

B.Movie The Dead Good Tapes B.Movie Remembrance Days (compilation album) B.Movie The BBC Sessions 1981-84 (2001)

- SBVART CD 002 - Einstürzende Neubauten - Drawings of Patient O.T. (1983)
- WISE 3CD : Wiseblood - Dirtdish (1987)
- 170 768 8 : Various - Redefining the Prologue (2006 Some Bizzare/Universal)
- 510 295-2 : Soft Cell - Non Stop Ecstatic Dancing (1992 Some Bizzare/Phonogram)
- 510 296-2 :Soft Cell - The Art Of Falling Apart (1992 Some Bizzare/Phonogram)
- 510 297-2 : Various - Some Bizzare Album (1992 Some Bizzare/Phonogram)
- 510 298-2 : Marc and the Mambas - Untitled (1992 Some Bizzare/Phonogram)
- 514 819-2 : Bizarre Inc - Surprise (1996 Some Bizzare/Mercury Records)
- 532 595-2 : Soft Cell - Non Stop Erotic Cabaret (1996 Some Bizzare/Mercury Records)
- 558 265-2 : Soft Cell - Non Stop Ecstatic Dancing (1998 Some Bizzare/Mercury Records)
- 558 266-2 : Soft Cell - The Art Of Falling Apart (1998 Some Bizzare/Mercury Records)
- 558 267-2 : Soft Cell - This Last Night In Sodom (1998 Some Bizzare/Mercury Records)
- 800 061-2 : Soft Cell - Non Stop Erotic Cabaret (1992 Some Bizzare/Phonogram)
- 814 518-2 : Dave Ball - In Strict Tempo (1992 Some Bizzare/Phonogram)
- 822 833-2 : Marc Almond - Vermin In Ermine (1992 Some Bizzare/Phonogram)
- 848 512-2 : Soft Cell / Marc Almond - Memorabilia, The Singles (1991 Some Bizzare/Mercury Records)
- 9031 75518-2 : Marc Almond - Tenement Symphony (1991 Some Bizzare/WEA)
- CDP 79 2999 2 : Zeke Manyika - Mastercrime (1989 Some Bizzare/Parlophone)
- CDP 79 4404 2 : Marc Almond - Enchanted (1990 Some Bizzare/Parlophone)
- CDP 92012 2 : Marc Almond - The Stars We Are (1988 Some Bizzare/Parlophone)

Marc Almond Treasure Box (2002 Some Bizzare/Parlophone) - Original recording remastered Marc Almond Fantastic Star Some Bizzare /WEA Mercury (1995)

== Compact cassette ==
=== Cassette albums ===
- BIZ LC 3 : Soft Cell - The Art of Falling Apart (1983)
- BIZ LC 4 : Marc and the Mambas - Torment & Toreros (1983)
- BIZ LC 6 : Soft Cell - This Last Night In Sodom (1984)
- BIZ LC 8 : Marc Almond - Vermin In Ermine (1984)
- BZMC 3 : Soft Cell - The Singles (1986)
- SBZC 021 : Marc Almond - Absinthe
- TESTC 23 : Test Dept - Beating The Retreat (1984)
- TCVM 9010 : Marc Almond - A Virgins Tale Vol 1 (1992)
- WOMB INC 6C : Foetus Inc - Sink
