= Jewels (Einstürzende Neubauten album) =

Studio album by Einstürzende Neubauten
- Released: 2006–2007 (by download); 15 July 2008 (commercially)
- Recorded: 2006–2007
- Genre: Noise rock Experimental
- Length: 43:52
- Label: Potomak (commercial release)

Einstürzende Neubauten chronology
Alles was irgendwie nützt (2006)	Jewels (2006)	Alles wieder offen (2007)

Professional ratings
Review scores
Source	Rating
AllMusic	3.5/5 stars
Pitchfork Media	(7.6/10)

Jewels is a supporter's album by Einstürzende Neubauten, completed in mid-2007. Instead of being released as a full album, it was released digitally one track at a time, available as website downloads only to subscribers of the Phase III Supporter Project, consisting of 15 "jewels" (as the band called them). Starting in March 2006, these downloadable tracks were released on or around the 15th of each month and were drawn from singer Blixa Bargeld's dreams.

Despite the Supporter Project site saying it "would form a digital-only album that will not be otherwise available", the album was eventually re-issued and released commercially through their own Potomak label as The Jewels in July 2008.

== Track listing ==
1. "Ich komme davon" (2:34), released March 15, 2006
2. "Mei Ro" (2:03), released April 15, 2006
3. "26 Riesen" (3:28), released May 15, 2006
4. "Hawcubite" (1:30), released June 15, 2006
5. "Die Libellen" (1:44), released July 15, 2006
6. "Jeder Satz mit ihr hallt nach" (3:45), released August 15, 2006
7. "Epharisto" (2:23), released September 15, 2006
8. "Robert Fuzzo" (2:37), released October 15, 2006
9. "Magyar energia" (3:01), released November 15, 2006
10. "Vicki" (1:44), released December 15, 2006
11. "Ansonsten Dostojevsky" (3:00), released January 16, 2007
12. "Die Ebenen werden nicht vermischt" (6:26), released February 15, 2007
13. "Am I only Jesus" (3:30), released June 15, 2007
14. "Bleib" (3:23), released July 15, 2007
15. "I kissed Glenn Gould" (2:44), released August 15, 2007

== Notes ==
The commercial release, an enhanced CD, also included a QuickTime movie Acht Lösungen, exclusive to the release.
