= Halber Mensch =

Studio album by Einstürzende Neubauten
- Released: 2 September 1985
- Recorded: 1983–1985
- Genres: Industrial; industrial rock; experimental rock
- Length: 35:32
- Label: Some Bizarre
- Producers: Gareth Jones, Einstürzende Neubauten

Einstürzende Neubauten chronology
Zeichnungen des Patienten O. T. (1983)	Halber Mensch (1985)	Fünf auf der nach oben offenen Richterskala (1987)

Halber Mensch (or 1/2 Mensch; English: Half Person) is the third studio album by the German industrial band Einstürzende Neubauten, released on 2 September 1985 by Some Bizzare Records in the U.K. and by What's So Funny About GmbH in Germany. In the U.S., the album was distributed by Rough Trade Records.

== Background ==
Halber Mensch shows a wider artistic range for the group, incorporating elements of electronic dance music in "Yü-Gung (Fütter mein Ego)" and performing the title track nearly a cappella. The group also expands their dynamic range; Blixa Bargeld's voice in "Seele Brennt" suddenly switches from a barely audible whisper to a high-pitched scream, while quiet bass guitar overtones float over relatively restrained percussion in "Letztes Biest (am Himmel)".

== Critical reception ==
Professional ratings
Review scores
Source	Rating
AllMusic	4.5/5 stars
Alternative Rock	8/10
Encyclopedia of Popular Music	3/5 stars
The Great Alternative & Indie Discography	5/10
Laut.de	5/5 stars
MusicHound Rock	4/5 stars
OndaRock	8.5/10
Spin Alternative Record Guide	7/10

Trouser Press described Halber Mensch as Einstürzende Neubauten's "strongest record" and "truly remarkable". AllMusic called it "an excellent feat of industrial music". In a 2019 feature, Pitchfork named it the second-best industrial album of all time.

== Reissue ==
In 2002, after a continuous conflict with Some Bizzare Records, the band released a remastered reissue of the album through their own label Potomak, with a slight variation of the cover image.

== Track listing ==
All tracks are written by Einstürzende Neubauten, except as noted.

Side A
No.	Title	Lyrics	Music	Length
1.	"Halber Mensch" ("Half Person")	Blixa Bargeld	Alexander Hacke, Bargeld, F.M. Einheit, Mark Chung, N.U. Unruh, Nikkolai Weidemann	4:13
2.	"Yü-Gung (Fütter Mein Ego)" ("Yugong (Feed My Ego)")			7:14
3.	"Trinklied" ("Drinking Song")			1:15
4.	"Z.N.S." ("C.N.S.")			5:40

Side B
No.	Title	Length
1.	"Seele Brennt" ("Soul Is Burning")	4:05
2.	"Sehnsucht (Zitternd)" ("Desire (Trembling)")	2:55
3.	"Der Tod Ist Ein Dandy" ("Death Is a Dandy")	6:41
4.	"Letztes Biest (Am Himmel)" ("Last Beast (In the Sky)")	3:28

CD bonus tracks
No.	Title	Writer(s)	Length
9.	"Sand" (Lee Hazlewood and Nancy Sinatra cover)	Hazlewood	3:30
10.	"Yü-Gung (Adrian Sherwood Remix)"		7:28
11.	"Das Schaben" ("The Rasping")		9:22

== Personnel ==
Einstürzende Neubauten

- Blixa Bargeld – production
- Mark Chung – production
- Alexander Hacke – production
- N.U. Unruh – production
- F.M. Einheit – production

Additional personnel

- Ma Gita – vocals
- Monika – vocals
- Sabrine – vocals
- Verena – vocals

Technical

- Gareth Jones – production, recording and mixing on all tracks except "Seele Brent"
- Nainz Watts – engineering
- Thomas Stern – engineering
- Michael Zimmerling – recording and mixing on "Seele Brennt"
- Tim Young – mastering
- Animal House – sleeve design
- Vincent Huang – sleeve photography
