= Zeichnungen des Patienten O. T. =

Studio album by Einstürzende Neubauten
- Released: 21 November 1983
- Recorded: January–August 1983
- Genre: Industrial; experimental
- Length: 40:34 (LP) 60:00 (Cass/CD)
- Label: Some Bizzare
- Producer: Einstürzende Neubauten

Einstürzende Neubauten chronology
Kollaps (1981)	Zeichnungen des Patienten O. T. (1983)	Halber Mensch (1985)

Professional ratings
Review scores
Source	Rating
AllMusic	4.5/5 stars

Zeichnungen des Patienten O. T. (or Drawings of Patient O. T.) is the second studio album by the Berlin-based musical group Einstürzende Neubauten. Some Bizzare Records released the album in 1983, and it was distributed in Germany by Rough Trade Deutschland. In the United States, PVC/Jem Records released the album in 1984 as Drawings of O. T.

The title refers to artist Oswald Tschirtner, an institutionalized schizophrenic who earned attention for his art. The original vinyl release of Zeichnungen des Patienten O. T. is Rough Trade Records #RTD 18 and Some Bizzare Records #SBVART 2.

== Overview ==
The album shows a wider variety of moods and sounds than did the group's first album, Kollaps. Einstürzende Neubauten is famous for banging, scraping, plucking or otherwise wringing sounds from resonant objects. While such metallic clatter pervades the album, the group also uses techniques such as found sounds (telephone conversations, the Hamburg fish market) and (pre-digital) sampling; for example, a sample of the Armenian song "Toun en kelkhen imastoun yes" is used in "Armenia". Bass guitar is relatively prominent, though generally played in a minimal style (and perhaps contributing more toward sonic texture rather than forming a rhythmic or harmonic foundation). Trouser Press critic David Sheridan pointed out the group's drift toward conventionality, writing that "the title track even has a chord progression!"

"Armenia" was later used in the soundtrack of Michael Mann's 1995 film Heat and his 1999 film The Insider.

== Track listing ==
1. "Vanadium-I-Ching" – 4:54
2. "Hospitalistische Kinder / Engel der Vernichtung" (Hospitalized Children/Angel of Destruction) – 5:09
3. "Abfackeln!" (Flare Off!) – 3:32
4. "Neun Arme" (Nine Arms) – 2:34
5. "Herde" (Herds) – 1:24
6. "Merle (Die Elektrik)" (Merle (Electricity)) – 2:20
7. "Zeichnungen des Patienten O.T." (Drawings of Patient O.T.) – 3:23
8. "Finger und Zähne" (Fingers and Teeth) – 0:09
9. "Falschgeld" (Counterfeit Money) – 2:42
10. "Styropor" (Polystyrene) – 2:24
11. "Armenia" – 4:57
12. "Die Genaue Zeit" (The Exact Time) – 7:06

=== Additional tracks ===
Some configurations (various cassette and compact disc versions) append one or more of the following tracks:

13. "Der Herrscher und der Sieger" (The Ruler and the Winner) – 3:32 (live recording)
14. "Affenroulette" (Ape Roulette)– 2:59 (live recording)
15. "Durstiges Tier" (Thirsty Animal) – 6:28 (1982 single)
16. "DNS-Wasserturm" (DNA-Watertower) – 6:27

The American vinyl release in 1984 included an EP comprising all four of these tracks.

== Personnel ==
Einstürzende Neubauten

- Blixa Bargeld – lead vocals, guitars, misc.
- Mark Chung – bass, backing vocals, misc.
- N.U. Unruh – percussion, backing vocals, misc.
- F.M. Einheit – percussion, backing vocals, misc.
- Alexander Hacke – tapes, percussion, "thirsty animal", misc.

Technical

- Jon Caffery – engineer
- Beate Bartel – bass on "Falschgeld"
