= Stimmen Reste =

Studio album by Einstürzende Neubauten
- Released: December 2006
- Genre: Abstract; Experimental
- Length: 40:03
- Label: Potomak

Einstürzende Neubauten chronology
Klaviermusik (2006)	Stimmen Reste (2006)	Weingeister (2007)

Stimmen Reste (English: Voice Remainders) is the seventh release of Einstürzende Neubauten's Musterhaus project, a series of highly experimental CD releases that were only available via an annual subscription through their website or from shows during their 25th Anniversary Tour. This project was separate from their Neubauten.org Supporter Project, which it ran concurrent to.

The focus of this Musterhaus release is manipulation and experimentation of leftover vocal recordings from earlier projects that were either not previously released ("Gestern"), or have never been properly recorded ("Semiotische Musik #5"). Enhancing them are some leftover recordings of polystyrene, electronic pulses, hammond organs, bass guitar, and metal percussions that also fell to the side.

== Track listing ==
1. "Wir Lesen Zeitung" (EN) – 4:32
2. "Kernstück" (EN) – 19:47
3. "Death" (Bargeld) – 2:00
4. "Tohuwabohu" (EN) – 8:48
5. "Semiotische Musik #5" (EN) – 0:40
6. "Grillen" (EN) – 1:36
7. "Gestern" (EN) – 2:02
8. "Hawonnnti!" (Bargeld, performed by N.U. Unruh) – 0:35

== Notes ==
The center piece ("Kernstück") is a speed-manipulated rework of the "Vox Populi" section of Grundstück including the 100 person "Social Choir".

"Hawonnnti!" was later re-used in the song "Let's Do It A Dada!" on their 2007 album Alles wieder offen.

Recorded, edited, and mixed by Boris Wilsdorf and Einstürzende Neubauten between 2003 and 2006 in Berlin
Produced by Einstürzende Neubauten
Mastered by Boris Wilsdorf
