= Heat (soundtrack) =

Soundtrack album to the 1995 film Heat

Soundtrack album by Various artists
- Released: December 19, 1995
- Genres: Contemporary classical, avant-garde, jazz fusion, electronica, alternative rock
- Length: 75 minutes
- Label: Warner Bros. Records
- Producers: Michael Mann (exec.); Matthias Gohl

Elliot Goldenthal chronology
Batman Forever (1995)	Heat (1995)	Michael Collins (1996)

Heat is the soundtrack album to the 1995 film Heat. The score is compiled mostly with Elliot Goldenthal's compositions although there are a variety of other artists featured, including U2/Brian Eno project Passengers, Lisa Gerrard, Moby and Terje Rypdal.

== The score ==
The track "New Dawn Fades" is only a part of the original song, and which fades into the next track. The track "God Moving Over the Face of the Waters" is slightly different from the version used in the film, the version on the score is from Moby's album Everything Is Wrong and the version in the film appears later on his 1997 album I Like to Score; Goldenthal composed and arranged the Kronos Quartet -performed pieces. The Einstürzende Neubauten track "Armenia" was taken from their 1983 album Zeichnungen des Patienten O. T. and was used by Michael Mann again in his 1999 film The Insider.

Goldenthal composed a cue called "Hand in Hand" originally meant to be played over the end scene, but it was replaced by Moby's "God Moving Over the Face of the Waters", so he used it, replacing guitars with bagpipes, instead for the end titles to Michael Collins. A clip of the track as it was meant to be heard in Heat can be heard below. There is also an "extended version" of the score in bootleg form, with several tracks (including "Hand in Hand") which can be heard in the film but are not on the score released, available on the internet.

Various tracks that were in some points of the film but did not make it to the soundtrack included pieces by William Orbit from his Strange Cargo albums, namely "The Last Lagoon," "Monkey King," and "The Mighty Limpopo."

Goldenthal explained his thinking behind the score:

In Heat, Michael Mann and I were going for an atmospheric situation. It was the first time I used what I like to call a "guitar orchestra" – where I use six or eight guitars, all playing with different tunings stacked up on top of each other in a musical way, and a mixed meter of percussion. It wasn't a type of score where you needed a big orchestral theme or you had to actually hit certain actions with music at specific times. It was much closer to the European mentality of film scoring.

The guitar orchestra, who play most significantly on two of the tracks below, is called "Deaf Elk" (an ensemble which includes Page Hamilton of the metal band Helmet) who also worked with Goldenthal for his scores, In Dreams and Titus.

The song "Always Forever Now" was written and performed by U2 and Brian Eno under the alias Passengers, and appears on Original Soundtracks 1. But the version featured on this soundtrack, and quite prominently in the film, is a longer mix with some minor variations.

== Track listing ==
Tracks written and performed by Elliot Goldenthal except where noted.

No.	Title	Writer(s)	Performer	Length
1.	"Heat"		Kronos Quartet	7:41
2.	"Always Forever Now" (from Original Soundtracks 1, 1995)	U2; Brian Eno	Passengers	6:54
3.	"Condensers"			2:35
4.	"Refinery Surveillance"		Kronos Quartet	1:45
5.	"Last Nite" (from Blue, 1987)	Terje Rypdal	Terje Rypdal, The Chasers	3:29
6.	"Ultramarine" (from Cobalt Blue, 1992)	Michael Brook	Brook	4:35
7.	"Armenia" (from Zeichnungen des Patienten O. T., 1983)	Blixa Bargeld; F.M. Einheit	Einstürzende Neubauten	4:58
8.	"Of Helplessness"			2:39
9.	"Steel Cello Lament"			1:43
10.	"Mystery Man" (from The Singles Collection, 1989)	Rypdal	Terje Rypdal	4:39
11.	"New Dawn Fades"	Ian Curtis; Peter Hook; Stephen Morris; Bernard Sumner	Moby	2:51
12.	"Entrada & Shootout"			1:49
13.	"Force Marker"	Eno	Eno	3:36
14.	"Coffee Shop"			1:38
15.	"Fate Scrapes"			1:34
16.	"La Bas: Song of the Drowned [Edited Version]" (from The Mirror Pool, 1995)	Lisa Gerrard	Gerrard	3:10
17.	"Gloradin" (from The Mirror Pool, 1995)	Gerrard	Gerrard	3:56
18.	"Run Uphill"			2:51
19.	"Predator Diorama"		Kronos Quartet	2:40
20.	"Of Separation"			2:21
21.	"God Moving Over the Face of the Waters" (from Everything Is Wrong, 1995)	Richard Hall	Moby	6:58

== Reception ==
Professional ratings
Review scores
Source	Rating
Filmtracks.com	4/5 stars
Musicfromthemovies	4/5 stars
Allmusic	3/5 stars

...an artfully assembled montage of industrial rock, darkly romantic symphonics and moody jazz guitar, evokes a nightmarish Los Angeles of dashed hopes and soiled glamour...

— The New York Times (2/11/96, Sec.2, p. 30)

Michael Mann films are notable for their high-quality soundtracks. HEAT is no exception...

— Q (4/96, p. 109)

== Personnel ==
=== Orchestral music ===
- Composer, Vocals, Orchestration – Elliot Goldenthal
- Orchestration – Robert Elhai
- Musical Score Producer – Matthias Gohl
- Conductor – Steven Mercurio
- Conductor – Jonathan Sheffer
- "Deaf Elk" Guitars – Page Hamilton, Eric Hubel, Bobby Hambel, David Reid
- Guitar – Michael Thompson
- Guitar – Mark Stewart
- Drums – Audun Kleive
- Performer – The Kronos Quartet
- Electronic Music Producer – Richard Martinez
- Engineer, Mixing – Joel Iwataki
- Music Editor – Christopher Brooks
- Music Editor – Michael Connell
- Music Editor, Mastering – Tom Baker
- Mastering – Vladimir Meller
- Assistant Engineer – Andrew Warwick
- Score Mixer & Recordist – Stephen McLaughlin

=== Artists ===
"Always Forever Now"

- Performer – Passengers
- Engineer – Danton Supple
- Assistant Engineer – Rob Kirwan
- Sequencing – Des Broadbery
- String Arrangements – Paul Barrett
- Music Supervisor – Budd Carr

"Last Nite", "Mystery Man"

- Guitar, Keyboards, Performer – Terje Rypdal
- Performer – The Chasers
- Bass – Bjorn Kjellemyr
- Keyboards – Allan Dangerfield
- Producer – Manfred Eicher

"Ultramarine"

- Producer, Performer – Michael Brook

"Armenia"

- Producer, Performer – Einstürzende Neubauten

"New Dawn Fades", "God Moving Over The Face Of The Waters"

- Producer, Performer, Writer – Moby
- Writer "New Dawn Fades" – Joy Division

"Force Marker"

- Producer, Performer – Brian Eno

"La Bas", "Gloradin"

- Producer, Performer – Lisa Gerrard

=== Executive credit ===
- Executive Producer – Michael Mann
- Executive in Charge of Music – Gary LeMel
- Assistant Music Supervisor – Amy Dunn
- Orchestra Contractor – Debbie Datz-Pyle, Patty Zimmitti
