= Ende Neu =

Studio album by Einstürzende Neubauten
- Released: July 23, 1996
- Recorded: 1994–96
- Genre: Experimental rock; industrial; dark ambient
- Length: 41:38
- Label: Mute
- Producer: Einstürzende Neubauten, Jon Caffery

Einstürzende Neubauten chronology
Tabula Rasa (1993)	Ende Neu (1996)	Silence Is Sexy (2000)

Professional ratings
Review scores
Source	Rating
AllMusic	3/5 stars
Pitchfork Media	4.6/10

Ende Neu is the seventh full-length studio album released by Einstürzende Neubauten in 1996. The title means "ending new"; it is a wordplay (reflected in the cover artwork) involving the band's name: Einstürzende Neubauten. This was the band's last studio album featuring member F.M. Einheit.

== Track listing ==
1. “Was Ist Ist” ("What Is Is") – 3:29
2. “Stella Maris” ("Star of the Sea") (featuring Meret Becker) – 5:18
3. “Die Explosion im Festspielhaus” ("The Explosion in the Festival Hall") – 4:30
4. “Installation No. 1” – 4:29
5. “NNNAAAMMM” – 10:59
6. “Ende Neu” ("Ending New") – 4:57
7. “The Garden” – 5:24
8. “Der Schacht von Babel” ("The Pit of Babel") – 2:46
9. “Bili Rubin” – 3:00

== Notes ==
"Bili Rubin" appears on the 1998 (CD) and 1996 (LP) re-releases.

The entire album was re-released as a remastered version that includes enhanced material.

== Personnel ==
Adapted from the Liner Notes of the Album

- Blixa Bargeld – vocals (all tracks), fill words (track 1), electric guitar (track 2), electric slide guitar (track 2), pencil and paper (track 3), Hammond organ (track 3), bass feedback (track 4), installation (track 4), amplifier (track 4), hand claps (track 5), air compressor (track 6), flute installation (track 5), choir vocals (track 5), Fender Rhodes (track 7), vibraphone (track 7), foot stomps (track 8), whistles (track 8)
- Alexander Hacke – bowed electric guitar (track 1), electric bass guitar (tracks 1, 2, 3, 4, 6, 7), electric guitar (tracks 1, 4, 6), fill words (track 1), hand claps (track 5), choir vocals (track 5), amplified wire (track 6), wood (track 6), metal canisters (track 6)
- Andrew Chudy – amplified bass spring (track 1), fill words (track 1), bass drum (tracks 2, 4), metal plate (tracks 2, 3, 4), chain (track 3), percussion (track 3), plastic canisters (track 4), electric drill (track 4), tone generator (track 4), installation (track 4), flute installation (track 5), hand claps (track 5), large resonating spring (track 5), amplified bass wire (track 6), plastic tube (track 6), plastic bin (track 7) foot stomps (track 8), amplified wire (track 8), motor leather belts (track 8), pythagorean tube bells (track 8), microphone percussion (track 8)
- F.M. Einheit – bass drum (track 1), metal plate (track 1), brushes (track 3), tank (track 4), metal percussion (track 4), plastic canisters (track 6)
- Meret Becker – vocals (tracks 2, 3)
- Jennifer Levy – vocals (track 3)
- Roland Wolf – Hammond organ (3), electric bass guitar (8)
- Klaus Meck – fill words (1)
- Boris Wilsdorf – fill words (1)
- Jochen Arbeit, Laurie Tomn, Ralf Strunz, Adrian Bilderberger, Axel Anonymus, Chrislo Haas, Maria Zastrow – choir vocals (1)
- Raoul Walton – electric bass guitar (5)
- Jean-Paul Zanutel – cello (tracks: 2, 6, 7)
- Carole Duteille (tracks: 2, 6, 7), Françoise Derissen (tracks: 2, 6, 7), Georges Siblik (tracks: 2, 6, 7), Ingrid Aelvoet (tracks: 2, 6, 7), Jean-Pierre Catoul (tracks: 2, 6, 7), Renaud Lhoest (tracks: 2, 6, 7) – violin
- Benoit Gilot (tracks: 2, 6, 7), Eric Gerstmans (tracks: 2, 6, 7), Samuel Aelvoet (tracks: 2, 6, 7) – viola
- Bertrand Burgalat – string arrangements (tracks: 2, 6, 7)
