= Lament (Einstürzende Neubauten album) =

2014 album

Studio album by Einstürzende Neubauten
- Released: 7 November 2014
- Recorded: December 2013 – September 2014
- Genre: Experimental
- Length: 72:48
- Language: English, German, Flemish
- Label: Mute
- Producer: Boris Wilsdorf, Einstürzende Neubauten

Einstürzende Neubauten chronology
Strategies Against Architecture IV (2010)	Lament (2014)	Alles in Allem (2020)

Lament is the eleventh studio album by German band Einstürzende Neubauten, released on 7 November 2014. The album is a studio reconstruction of a performance piece commissioned by the Belgian town of Diksmuide to commemorate the outbreak of World War I. Among the album's pieces are an opening track featuring lyrics that are not sung, but intended to be read by the audience.

The track "The Willy - Nicky Telegrams" is a duet between Alexander Hacke, playing Russian Tsar Nicholas II, and Blixa Bargeld, as Kaiser Wilhelm of Germany, discussing the diplomatic manoeuvring that led to war via telegram exchange. The two royals, first cousins by marriage, referred to one another as "Willy" and "Nicky". Elsewhere, "Der 1. Weltkrieg" is a sonic representation of each country's entry and retreat from the war, with each country represented by a pitched pipe.

The performance also includes two songs written by James Reese Europe, musical director of the United States' 369th Infantry Regiment, also known as the Harlem Hellfighters.

== Track listing ==
No.	Title	Writer	Length
1.	"Kriegsmaschinerie"	music: Bargeld, Chudy, Hacke, Arbeit, Moser lyrics: Bargeld	5:30
2.	"Hymnen"	Arranged by Bargeld, Chudy, Hacke, Arbeit and Moser lyrics: Bargeld, based on various hymns	2:49
3.	"The Willy - Nicky Telegrams"	music: Bargeld, Chudy, Hacke, Arbeit, Moser lyrics: Bargeld, based on the telegraphic correspondence between Wilhelm II, German Emperor and Nicholas II of Russia	6:24
4.	"In De Loopgraaf"	music: Bargeld, Chudy, Hacke lyrics: Paul van den Broeck (1916)	4:15
5.	"Der 1. Weltkrieg" (Percussion Version)	music: Bargeld, Chudy, Hacke lyrics: Bargeld	13:14
6.	"On Patrol In No Man's Land"	Arranged by Bargeld, Chudy, Hacke, Arbeit and Moser lyrics: James Reese Europe, Bargeld	3:10
7.	"Achterland"	music: Bargeld, Chudy, Hacke, Arbeit, Moser lyrics: Paul van den Broeck (1916)	3:17
8.	"Lament: 1. Lament"	music: Bargeld, Chudy, Hacke, Arbeit, Moser lyrics: Bargeld	6:24
9.	"Lament: 2. Abwärtsspirale"	music: Bargeld, Chudy, Hacke, Arbeit, Moser lyrics: Bargeld	2:29
10.	"Lament: 3. Pater Peccavi"	music: Bargeld, Chudy, Hacke, Arbeit, Moser lyrics: based on "The Prodigal Son" by Jacob Clemens non Papa	5:34
11.	"How Did I Die?"	music: Bargeld, Chudy, Hacke lyrics: Bargeld	7:13
12.	"Sag Mir Wo Die Blumen Sind"	music: Peter Seeger lyrics: Max Colpet	3:39
13.	"Der Beginn des Weltkrieges 1914 (Dargestellt unter Zuhilfenahme eines Tierstimmenimitators)"	music: Bargeld, Chudy, Hacke, Arbeit, Moser lyrics: Joseph Plaut (1926)	5:47
14.	"All of No Man's Land Is Ours"	Arranged by Bargeld lyrics: James Reese Europe	2:54
