= Mark Chung =

Mark Chung may refer to:

- Mark Chung (soccer)
- Mark Chung (musician)
