= Berlin Babylon =

2001 documentary film by Hubertus Siegert

- Directed by: Hubertus Siegert
- Written by: Hubertus Siegert
- Produced by: Hubertus Siegert
- Starring: Günther Behnisch; Helmut Jahn; I. M. Pei; Rem Koolhaas; Hans Kollhoff; Renzo Piano
- Narrated by: Angela Winkler
- Cinematography: Ralf K. Dobrick; Thomas Plenert
- Edited by: Peter Przygodda; Anne Schnee
- Music by: Einstürzende Neubauten
- Release date: 2001 (Berlin)
- Running time: 88 minutes
- Country: Germany
- Language: German

Berlin Babylon is a 2001 German documentary film directed by Hubertus Siegert with industrial music performed by Einstürzende Neubauten. The film's main focus is on the extensive rebuilding projects in Berlin after the fall of the Berlin Wall. It features internationally acclaimed architects including Rem Koolhaas, Renzo Piano, and I.M. Pei.

Some sequences are characterized by time-lapse photography along with the narration of Der Engel der Geschichte (the Angel of History). The documentary also contains stock footage of demolitions of the buildings which were left to stand in ruins after the Second World War.

== Music ==
Berlin Babylon

Soundtrack album by Einstürzende Neubauten
- Released: 2001
- Genre: Film score, Industrial
- Length: 37:46
- Label: Our Choice / Rough Trade
- Producer: Einstürzende Neubauten; Boris Wilsdorf

The soundtrack to the film is composed and performed by Einstürzende Neubauten, and released in 2001.

1. "Berlin Babylon" (Title) – 4:20
2. "Godzilla in Mitte" – 2:22
3. "Overtüre mit Helikoptern" – 1:05
4. "Walkie Talkie Babylon" – 2:07
5. "Trauermarsch" – 2:12
6. "Glas 1" (Sony-Center) – 2:03
7. "Befindlichkeit" (Baustellenversion) – 4:50
8. "Der Engel der Geschichte" – 1:24
9. "Beauty" (Tiergartentunnel) – 2:50
10. "Glas 2" (Richtfest) – 2:03
11. "Architektur ist Geiselnahme" – 3:05
12. "Gästeliste" – 3:42
13. "Die Befindlichkeit des Landes" – 5:31
- "Berlin Babylon (Titel)", "Walkie talkie Babylon" and "Befindlichkeit (Baustellenversion)" are instrumental variations of the song "Die Befindlichkeit des Landes".
- "Godzilla in Mitte" is an instrumental version of "Architektur ist Geiselnahme".
- "Overtüre mit Helikoptern" includes an extended sample of the Vorspiel to Act I of Richard Wagner's Die Walküre.
- "Beauty (Tiergartentunnel)" is an instrumental version of the song "Beauty". It was later released with vocals on Silence is Sexy.
- "Trauermarsch" is an orchestral score: Symphony No.3, Opus 55, 2nd movement (Ludwig van Beethoven), recorded in 1934. Hans Knappertsbusch conducted the Berlin Philharmonic Orchestra.
