= Alles in Allem =

Studio album by Einstürzende Neubauten
- Released: May 15, 2020
- Recorded: May 2019 – February 2020
- Genres: Experimental; industrial
- Length: 44:02
- Label: Potomak
- Producer: Einstürzende Neubauten

Einstürzende Neubauten chronology
Lament (2014)	Alles in Allem (2020)	Rampen (apm: alien pop music) (2024)

Professional ratings
Review scores
Source	Rating
AllMusic	3.5/5 stars
Laut.de	5/5 stars
Musikexpress	4.5/6 stars
Release Magazine	9/10

Alles in Allem is the twelfth studio album by German industrial band Einstürzende Neubauten. It was released in 2020 on Potomak.

== Reception ==
Adam Lehrer of The Quietus wrote: " This is one of the most compulsively listenable albums that Neubauten have ever produced, and the band still manages to jar and shock its listeners with a bewildering array of otherworldly sounds. Accessible doesn’t always mean safe or boring. Neubauten are still a genre bastard, and I dare you to name another band this deep into their career still expanding their palette to such an extreme degree."

== Track listing ==
1. "Ten Grand Goldie" – 5:21
2. "Am Landwehrkanal" – 3:03
3. “Möbliertes Lied" – 4:29
4. "Zivilisatorisches Missgeschick" – 4:01
5. "Taschen" – 4:43
6. "Seven Screws" – 3:54
7. "Alles in Allem" – 4:17
8. "Grazer Damm" – 6:26
9. "Wedding" – 4:26
10. "Tempelhof" – 3:22
