= Halber Mensch (film) =

- Frame from the film
- Directed by: Gakuryū Ishii
- Production company: Director's Company
- Release date: 1986
- Country: Japan
- Languages: German, Japanese

Halber Mensch (also known as 1/2 Mensch) is a 1986 documentary film by Japanese director Gakuryū Ishii, then going by the name Sōgo Ishii, featuring German band Einstürzende Neubauten. It was originally released on VHS, and re-released on DVD in 2005. The film's title comes from the album of the same name.

== Synopsis ==
The one-hour film documents Einstürzende Neubauten's visit to Japan in 1985. It includes concert footage along with scenes of the band performing in an industrial building. Several songs from the "Halber Mensch" album are presented as music videos, some with accompanying Butoh dancers.

== Release ==
According to DVDManiacs, the DVD was originally mastered from a VHS tape, and the quality is therefore not as high as a usual DVD. The band, due to disputes with the manager of the label involved, have since released a remastered DVD on their own label.
