= Silence Is Sexy =

Studio album by Einstürzende Neubauten
- Released: May 23, 2000
- Recorded: April 1998–January 2000
- Genre: experimental; industrial
- Length: 68:29
- Label: Mute
- Producer: Einstürzende Neubauten

Einstürzende Neubauten chronology
Ende Neu (1996)	Silence Is Sexy (2000)	Perpetuum Mobile (2004)

Professional ratings
Review scores
Source	Rating
Allmusic	3/5 stars
NME	2/5 stars
Visions	8/12 stars

Silence Is Sexy is the eighth full-length studio album from the German experimental band Einstürzende Neubauten and was released in 2000.

== Track listing ==
1. “Sabrina” (4:39)
2. “Silence Is sexy” (7:00)
3. “In Circles” (2:30)
4. “Newtons Gravitätlichkeit” ("Newton's Gravi-agitation") (2:01)
5. “Zampano” (5:40)
6. “Heaven is of Honey” (3:54)
7. “Beauty” (1:59)
8. “Die Befindlichkeit des Landes” ("The Lay of the Land") (5:43)
9. “Sonnenbarke” ("Sun Ship") (7:49)
10. “Musentango” ("Muse Tango") (2:13)
11. “Alles” ("Everything") (4:43)
12. “Redukt” (10:17)
13. “Dingsaller” (5:46)
14. “Total Eclipse of the Sun” (3:52)

The German release replaces “Total Eclipse of the Sun” with “Anrufe in Abwesenheit” ("Missed Calls"). A limited edition of the album included a bonus disc featuring the 18-minute-long “Pelikanol.”

== Personnel ==
Einstürzende Neubauten

- Jochen Arbeit
- Blixa Bargeld
- Alexander Hacke
- Rudolph Moser
- N.U. Unruh
