= BZS =

BZS or BZs may refer to:

- Brazilian Sign Language, by ISO 639 language code
- BZs, slang for benzodiazepines
- Code for a model of Z type carriage
- Bermuda Zoological Society, a source of support for the Bermuda Aquarium, Museum and Zoo
- Identification code for some records produced by Some Bizzare Records
- Nickname of Barisal Zilla School in Barisal, Bangladesh
- Nickname of Bogra Zilla School in Bogra, Bangladesh
