= Malediction =

Malediction may refer to:

- Curse, wish that some form of adversity or unhappiness befall another person
- Malediction (EP), a 1993 EP by Einstürzende Neubauten
- Malédiction, a work for piano and string orchestra by Franz Liszt
- The Malediction, a 1952 novel by Jean Giono

== See also ==
- La malédiction, a 1991 adventure video game
