= ANBB =

Experimental music project

- Performing in A Coruña, 2010

Background information
- Years active: 2007-2010
- Members: Alva Noto; Blixa Bargeld

ANBB is a project between Alva Noto a.k.a. Carsten Nicolai and Blixa Bargeld, the singer, guitarist and composer of Einsturzende Neubauten.

Being friends and admirers of each other’s work for a long time, Noto and Bargeld decided to join forces to initiate a collaborative project in 2007. Together they developed a musical concept based on the combination of improvisation and abstraction. The impulsive live performance of Bargeld and the elaborated beat structures and sound landscapes of Noto merge to a surprising and unexpected result. Working on their own experimental material that gains its strength from the spontaneity of the live performance of Bargeld’s voice as well as rethinking traditional songs in their own special manner, they deliver an outstanding and inspiring musical blend for their audience.

The collaboration first staged in September 2007 when they united for a special appearance in San Francisco to perform at Recombinant Media Labs studios. Since then they have recorded several tracks, five of which were released on a preliminary EP on Raster-Noton (r-n 120) in June 2010. A full-length album with 10 tracks (r-n 121) was released some weeks later, followed by a live tour at various festivals and concert halls in Europe in June/September 2010.
