= Ste van Holm =

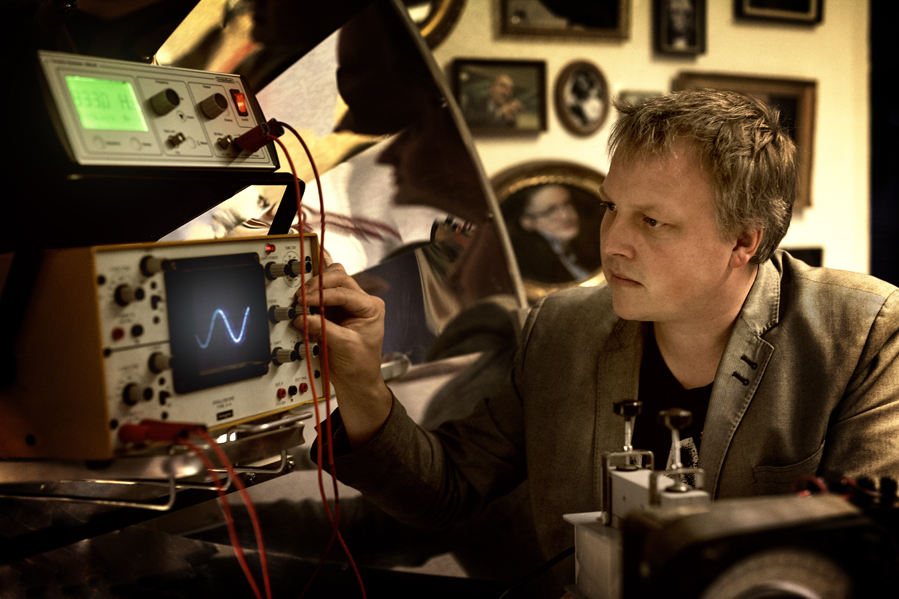
- Ste van Holm 2015

Background information
- Birth name: Stefan Holm
- Born: 27 November 1977 (age 47)
- Origin: Frederiksberg, Copenhagen, Denmark
- Genres: Ambient, experimental rock, pop, art rock, new-age
- Occupation(s): Musician, record producer
- Instrument(s): synthesizer, guitar, bass guitar, chapman stick
- Years active: 1999–present
- Labels: Polyhistor, MusicVenture
- Website: www.stevanholm.com

Ste van Holm (born Stefan Holm; 1977 in Frederiksberg, Copenhagen, Denmark) is a Danish musician and video artist.

He has currently released seven albums (February 2018), all of which are available on iTunes.

He has worked as live sound engineer for Danish band Entakt for whom he also mixed the album Kun en elektrisk summen fra en neonreklame der skulle have forestillet solen.

== Discography ==
=== Odyssey (2001) ===
Odyssey is the title of Ste van Holm's first full-length album which was released in 2001.

=== Tabula Rasa (2004) ===
Tabula Rasa is the second full-length album released by Ste van Holm.

=== Tesla (2015) ===
In Croatia the Vecernji List newspaper dedicated a whole page to Ste van Holm and the 'Tesla' project.

== Music videos ==
Besides directing videos for his own music, Ste van Holm has also directed for Majbritt Løfgreen and Trey Gunn (King Crimson). In addition, Ste van Holm directed the movie Traumfestival about German band Einstürzende Neubauten in 2003.
