= Abwärts =

German post-punk band

- Origin: Hamburg, West Germany
- Genres: Post-punk
- Years active: 1979–present
- Labels: Zickzack
- Website: abwaerts.com

Abwärts ("Downwards") is a German post-punk band from Hamburg. Members FM Einheit and Mark Chung would leave the group in the early 1980s to join West Berlin band Einstürzende Neubauten.

== Biography ==
Their best-known recordings include the single "Computerstaat" ("Computer State") (1980) and the albums Amok Koma (1981) and Der Westen ist einsam ("The West Is Lonely") (1982), the latter in particular being regarded as a classic of West German post-punk. The band also recorded a cover version of the song You Only Live Twice by Leslie Bricusse and John Barry and under the title "Alkohol" (Alcohol) a new interpretation of the German version of the song Tu t'laisses aller by Charles Aznavour with slightly different lyrics for their self-titled album Abwärts (1987).

The group is profiled along with other contemporaries in Jürgen Teipel's 2001 documentary novel Verschwende Deine Jugend.

== Discography ==
=== Albums ===
- 1980 – Amok Koma (LP)
- 1980 – Musik Für Deutsche GI's (Cassette)
- 1980 – Live (Cassette)
- 1982 – Der Westen Ist Einsam (LP/Cassette)
- 1987 – Abwärts (LP/CD)
- 1990 – Ich Seh Die Schiffe Den Fluss Herunterfahren (LP/CD/Cassette)
- 1991 – Comic-Krieg (LP/CD/Cassette)
- 1993 – Herzlich Willkommen Im Irrenhaus (LP/CD/Cassette)
- 1994 – Hurra (LP/CD/Cassette)
- 1995 – V8 (LP/CD)
- 2004 – Nuprop (LP/CD)
- 2007 – Rom (LP/CD)
- 2009 – Sei Auch Dabei - Live 2009 (Download)
- 2011 – Europa Safe (LP/CD)
- 2014 – Krautrock (LP/CD/Download)
- 2018 – Smart Bomb (LP/CD/Cassette/Download)
- 2021 – Live In Die 20er Jahre (LP/Download)
- 2023 – Superfucker (LP/CD/Download)

=== Singles & EPs ===
- 1980 – Computerstaat (7")
- 1981 – Roboter In Der Nacht (7")
- 1982 – Beirut, Holiday Inn (7"/12")
- 1984 – Olympia (12")
- 1987 – Alkohol (Neue Mischung), (7", Promo)
- 1987 – Alkohol (7")
- 1988 – Mehr Alkohol (7"/12"/CD)
- 1989 – Die Zeit (7"/12"/CD)
- 1990 – Sonderzug Zur Endstation / Ich Seh Die Schiffe Den Fluß Herunterfahren (7"/12"/CD)
- 1991 – Vorsicht! (CD, Promo)
- 1994 – Terror-Beat (7"/CD)
- 2004 – Nuprop (LP/CD)
- 2007 – Rom (LP/CD)
- 2009 – Sei Auch Dabei! (12")
- 2016 – Affentanz (Download)
