= Perpetuum Mobile (album) =

Studio album by Einstürzende Neubauten
- Released: February 10, 2004
- Recorded: August 2002 – June 2003
- Genre: Experimental; industrial
- Length: 66:56
- Label: Mute
- Producer: Einstürzende Neubauten

Einstürzende Neubauten chronology
Silence Is Sexy (2000)	Perpetuum Mobile (2004)	Alles wieder offen (2007)

Professional ratings
Review scores
Source	Rating
Allmusic	2.5/5 stars
Pitchfork Media	(7.5/10)
The Guardian	4/5 stars

Perpetuum Mobile is the ninth full-length studio album by the industrial band Einstürzende Neubauten. It was released in 2004 on Mute Records. The album is an offshoot of the band's first fans-only recording experiment, and was released in part to facilitate a world tour.

== Track listing ==
1. “Ich gehe jetzt” ("I am going now") – 3:31
2. “Perpetuum Mobile” ("Perpetual Motion") – 13:41
3. “Ein leichtes leises Säuseln” ("A Low, Light Murmur") – 4:31
4. “Selbstportrait mit Kater” ("Self-Portrait with Hangover") – 6:12
5. “Boreas” – 3:59
6. “Ein seltener Vogel” ("A Rare Bird") – 9:14
7. “Ozean und Brandung” ("Ocean and Surf") – 3:44
8. “Paradiesseits” ("Paradising") – 4:07
9. “Youme & Meyou” – 4:39
10. “Der Weg ins Freie” ("The Way into the Open") – 4:04
11. “Dead Friends (Around the Corner)” – 5:14
12. “Grundstück” ("Plot of land") – 3:41

== Themes ==
Perpetuum Mobile contains overarching references to its namesake perpetuum mobile (the musical term) and to perpetual motion (the physical concept). Other ideas include Boreas, Ararat (of note both for the Einstürzende Neubauten song "Armenia" and Mount Ararat), travel and airplanes, and rare birds.
