= Strategies Against Architecture II =

Compilation album by Einstürzende Neubauten
- Released: May 21, 1991
- Genre: Experimental rock Industrial rock Avant-garde; Dark ambient
- Length: 91:57 (CD); 85:14 (LP)
- Label: Reihe EGO/Rough Trade Germany; Mute/Elektra

Einstürzende Neubauten chronology
Die Hamletmaschine (1991)	Strategies Against Architecture II (1991)	Tabula Rasa (1993)

Professional ratings
Review scores
Source	Rating
AllMusic	4/5 stars

Strategies Against Architecture II is a retrospective double album by experimental artists Einstürzende Neubauten, released in 1991.

== Track listing ==
=== Disc one ===
1. "Abfackeln" – 3:30
2. "Partynummer" (live) – 1:35
3. "Z.N.S." – 5:39
4. "Die Elektrik (Merle)" – 2:21
5. "Intermezzo/Yü-Gung" (live) – 6:18
6. "Seele Brennt" – 4:08
7. "Blutvergiftung" – 1:50
8. "Sand" – 3:30
9. "Kangolicht" – 4:14
10. "Armenia" (live) – 4:39
11. "Ein Stuhl in der Hölle" – 2:08

=== Disc two ===
1. "Vanadium I Ching" – 4:53
2. "Leid und Elend" (live) – 4:35
3. "DNS Wasserturm" – 6:27
4. "Armenia II" (live) – 3:46
5. "Fackeln!" – 1:56
6. "Ich bin's" – 3:21
7. "Hirnlego" – 3:09
8. "Wardrobe" – 2:39
9. "Bildbeschreibung" – 9:31
10. "Haus der Lüge" (live) – 4:37
11. "Jordache" – 0:28
12. "Kein Bestandteil sein" (Alternative Ending) – 6:43

== Notes ==
The album was also released on double-LP and as a single long-playing cassette, both of which did not contain the track "Kein Bestandteil sein (Alternative Ending)."
