= Malediction (EP) =

EP by Einstürzende Neubauten
- Released: 1993
- Genre: Experimental, industrial
- Length: 24:08
- Label: Mute
- Producer: Einstürzende Neubauten, Jon Caffery

Malediction is a 1993 EP released by Einstürzende Neubauten.

The EP's cover includes a painting by Ambrosius Bosschaert. Elsewhere on the sleeve the group thanks the art historian Claus Grimm and recommends his book Stilleben.

== Track listing ==
1. "Blume" (French Version) - 4:35
2. "Blume" (English Version) - 4:31
3. "Blume" (Japanese Version) - 4:31
4. "Ubique Media Daemon" - 4:31
5. "3 Thoughts" - 4:40
6. "Ring My Bell" - 1:05

== Personnel ==
- Diana Orlof - vocals, translation on "Blume" French version
- Anita Lane - vocals, translation on "Blume" English version
- Etsuko Sakamaki-Haas - vocals on "Blume" Japanese version and "Ring My Bell", translation on "Blume" Japanese version
- Thomas Wydler - snare drum on "Ubique Media Daemon"
