= Alles wieder offen =

Studio album by Einstürzende Neubauten
- Released: 19 October 2007
- Recorded: February 2006 – June 2007
- Genre: Experimental rock
- Length: 53:37
- Label: Potomak / Independent
- Producer: Einstürzende Neubauten

Einstürzende Neubauten chronology
Perpetuum Mobile (2004)	Alles wieder offen (2007)	Strategies Against Architecture IV (2010)

Professional ratings
Review scores
Source	Rating
Allmusic	4/5 stars
Pitchfork Media	(7.9/10)

Alles wieder offen is the tenth studio album by the German experimental band Einstürzende Neubauten. It was released on 19 October 2007 in Europe and 6 November in America. The title translated into English is "Everything Open Again".

== Track listing ==
1. "Die Wellen" ("Waves") – 3:47
2. "Nagorny Karabach" ("Nagorno-Karabakh")– 4:25
3. "Weil weil weil" ("Because Because Because") – 4:57
4. "Ich hatte ein Wort" ("I Had a Word") – 4:19
5. "Von Wegen" ("Of Ways") – 5:36
6. "Let's Do It a Dada" – 5:52
7. "Alles wieder offen" (Everything Open Again") – 4:14
8. "Unvollständigkeit" ("Incompleteness") – 9:01
9. "Susej" – 4:47
10. "Ich warte" ("I'm Waiting") – 6:07

=== Supporter edition ===
This version of the album was sent to fans who paid to participate in Einstürzende Neubauten's Phase III supporter project. The supporter version is an expanded edition of the album and some copies also include a DVD.

1. "Die Wellen" – 3:48
2. "Nagorny Karabach" – 4:25
3. "Weil weil weil" – 4:57
4. "Ich hatte ein Wort" – 4:20
5. "Von Wegen" – 5:38
6. "Let's Do It a Dada" – 5:54
7. "Wenn dann" ("If Then") – 3:11
8. "Alles wieder offen" – 4:14
9. "Unvollständigkeit" – 9:05
10. "Venuskolonie" ("Venus Colony") – 8:35
11. "Blue Ice" – 1:52
12. "Birth Lunch Death" – 3:23
13. "Susej" – 4:49
14. "Ich warte" – 6:09
