= Potomak =

German record label

Potomak (Serbo-Croatian for "descendant") is an artist record label for the German experimental rock band Einstürzende Neubauten. It was founded by the band's front man Blixa Bargeld in 1988 to support the re-release of the band's Kollaps album on CD format. It also enabled the band to assume ownership of their music and operate outside of a label contract. Potomak also serves as the label for band member's solo projects and has released albums from Alexander Hacke, Rudolph Moser and Blixa Bargeld. Potomak releases are distributed through Rykodisc and Indigo.

== Discography ==
- 2008 Einstürzende Neubauten The Jewels (CD, Album, Enh, RE, Eco)
- 2008 Einstürzende Neubauten The Jewels (LP, Album)
- 2008 Alexander Hacke & Danielle de Picciotto The Ship Of Fools (CD, CD/)
- 2008 Rudolph Moser Moser (CD, Album)
- 2008 Blixa Bargeld Commissioned Music (CD, Comp, RE, RM, Dig)
- 2007 Einstürzende Neubauten Jewels (File, MP3, Album, WAV)
- 2007 Einstürzende Neubauten Weil Weil Weil (File, MP3)
- 2007 Einstürzende Neubauten Alles Wieder Offen (CD, Enh, Album, Promo)
- 2007 Einstürzende Neubauten Alles Wieder Offen (CD, Album, Ltd)
- 2007 Einstürzende Neubauten Alles Wieder Offen (CD, Album)
- 2007 Einstürzende Neubauten Weil Weil Weil (CD, Maxi)
- 2007 Einstürzende Neubauten Alles Wieder Offen (2xLP, Album, Gat)
- 2003 Einstürzende Neubauten Kollaps (CD)
- 2002 Einstürzende Neubauten Fuenf Auf Der Nach Oben Offenen Richterskala (CD, Album, RE)
- 2002 Einstürzende Neubauten Zeichnungen Des Patienten O.T. / Drawings Of Patient O.T. (CD, Album, RM)
- 2002 Einstürzende Neubauten Haus Der Lüge (CD, Album, RM, Dig)
- 2002 Einstürzende Neubauten 9-15-2000, Brussels (2xCD, Dig)
- 2002 Einstürzende Neubauten 1/2 Mensch (CD, Album, RE)
- 2002 Einstürzende Neubauten Zeichnungen Des Patienten O.T. (Drawings Of Patient O.T.) (LP)
- 2002 Einstürzende Neubauten Haus Der Lüge (LP, Album, RE)
- 2002 Einstürzende Neubauten Kollaps (LP, RE)
- 2002 Einstürzende Neubauten 1/2 Mensch (LP, Album, RE)
- 2002 Einstürzende Neubauten Fünf Auf Der Nach Oben Offenen Richterskala (LP)
- 1997 Ninos con Bombas El Niño (CD, Album)
- 1989 Pig Sick City / Shit For Brains (12", Single)
- 1988 Einstürzende Neubauten Kollaps (CD)

== MUSTERHAUS Series ==
- 2007 MUSTERHAUS 8 Einstürzende Neubauten Weingeister (CD, Enh, Dig)
- 2006 MUSTERHAUS 7 Einstürzende Neubauten Stimmen Reste (CD, Album, Dig)
- 2006 MUSTERHAUS 6 Einstürzende Neubauten Klaviermusik (CD)
- 2006 MUSTERHAUS 5 Einstürzende Neubauten Kassetten (CD)
- 2006 MUSTERHAUS 4 Redux Orchestra versus Einstürzende Neubauten Redux Orchestra versus Einstürzende Neubauten (CD, Album)
- 2006 MUSTERHAUS 3 Einstürzende Neubauten Solo Bassfeder - Komposition (CD)
- 2005 MUSTERHAUS 2 Einstürzende Neubauten Unglaublicher Laerm (CD, Dig)
- 2005 MUSTERHAUS 1 Einstürzende Neubauten Anarchitektur (CD, Album)

== Supporter Project ==
- 2007 Einstürzende Neubauten Alles Wieder Offen (Supporter Edition) (CD, Album, Ltd, Dig)
- 2005 Einstürzende Neubauten Grundstueck (Supporters' Album #2) (CD + DVD)
- 2005 Einstürzende Neubauten Grundstueck (Supporters' Album #2) (CD, Album)

== DVD/Video ==
- 2007 Einstürzende Neubauten 3 Jewels (DVD, PAL, NTSC)
- 2005 Einstürzende Neubauten 1/2 Mensch (DVD + CD)
- 2005 Einstürzende Neubauten 1/2 Mensch (DVD)
