= Einstürzende Neubauten =

German experimental band

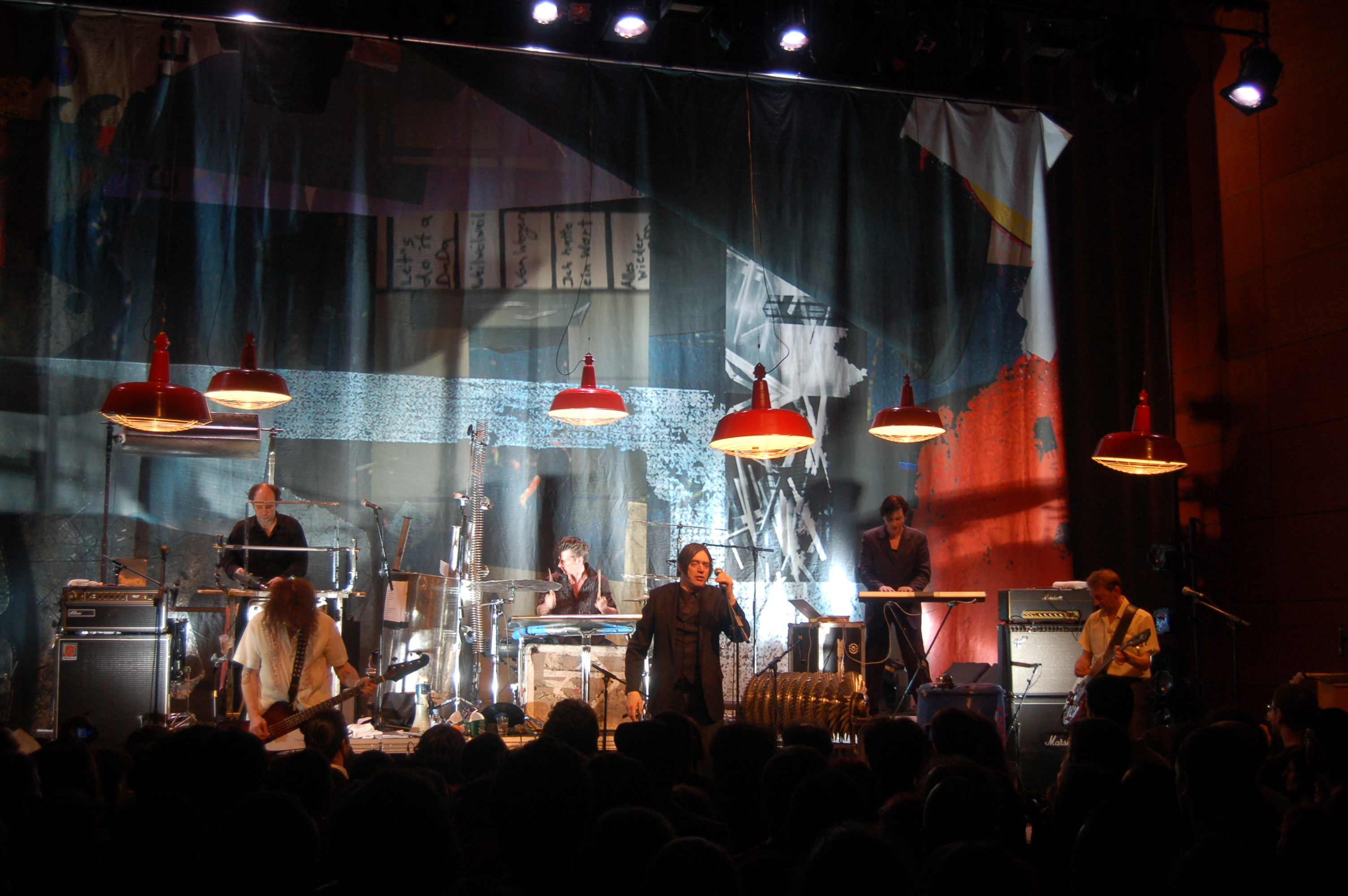
- Einstürzende Neubauten in 2008

Background information
- Origin: West Berlin, West Germany
- Genres: Industrial; experimental rock; post-industrial; noise
- Years active: 1980–present
- Labels: ZickZack; Some Bizzare; Mute
- Members: Blixa Bargeld; N.U. Unruh; Jochen Arbeit; Rudolph Moser; Josefine Lukschy
- Past members: Beate Bartel; Gudrun Gut; F.M. Einheit; Mark Chung; Roland Wolf; Alexander Hacke
- Website: neubauten.org

Einstürzende Neubauten (German: [ˈaɪnˌʃtʏʁtsn̩də ˈnɔʏˌbaʊtn̩], lit. 'Collapsing New Buildings') is a German experimental music group, formed in West Berlin in 1980. The band currently comprises founding members Blixa Bargeld (lead vocals, guitar, keyboard) and N.U. Unruh (custom-made instruments, percussion, vocals), plus Jochen Arbeit (guitar, vocals), and Rudolph Moser (custom-built instruments, percussion, vocals), who both joined the line-up in 1997. In 2026, Josefine Lukschy joined the band as the bass player.

One of their trademarks is the use of custom-built instruments, predominantly made out of scrap metal and building tools, and noises, in addition to standard musical instruments. Their early albums were unremittingly harsh, with Bargeld's vocals shouted and screamed above a din of banging and scraping metal percussion. Subsequent recordings found the group's sound growing somewhat more conventional, yet still containing many unorthodox elements.

== History ==
=== 1980s ===
On 1 April 1980, Einstürzende Neubauten made their first appearance, at the Moon Club in West Berlin. This first lineup featured Beate Bartel and Gudrun Gut, Blixa Bargeld, and N.U. Unruh. The two female members, Bartel and Gut - who had also been members of the underground band Mania D - left Einstürzende Neubauten after a short period, founding Liaisons Dangereuses and Malaria! respectively.

In 1981, 15 year old sound technician and multi-instrumentalist Alexander Hacke (alias Alexander von Borsig) and percussionist F.M. Einheit (from the Hamburg band Abwärts) joined Einstürzende Neubauten, and they released their first LP, Kollaps ("Collapse"), a mixture of rough punk tunes and industrial noises. The industrial noises were obtained from self-made music machines, electronics, and found objects such as metal plates. The live performances with Einheit in the 1980s included much metal banging and destruction on stage.

During their first German tour, Mark Chung (previously the bass player with Abwärts) joined the group of musicians. This lineup lasted nearly 15 years.

In 1983, Einstürzende Neubauten recorded their second album, Zeichnungen des Patienten O. T. ("Drawings of Patient O.T."). The title came from a 1974 book by Leo Navratil, describing the drawings of Oswald Tschirtner. The band also appeared as guest performers on Fad Gadget's "Collapsing New People" 7" single's B-side track Spoil The Child, recorded at Hansa Tonstudio, Berlin in November 1983.

Also in 1983, Bargeld joined The Birthday Party (featuring Nick Cave and Mick Harvey) in the studio, appearing as a guitarist on their track "Mutiny in Heaven". That group soon disbanded, but Bargeld became a longtime member of one of the bands that sprang from it, Nick Cave and the Bad Seeds (again featuring Cave and Harvey). Bargeld remained a full-time member of both Einstürzende Neubauten and Nick Cave and the Bad Seeds until 2003, when he quit the Bad Seeds in order to focus on Einstürzende Neubauten.

In 1984, Einstürzende Neubauten, with guests including Genesis P-Orridge, Stevo Pearce, Frank Tovey and others, played a show titled The Concerto for Voices and Machinery at the ICA in London. After 20 minutes the venue halted the show when the band began to dig through the venue's stage with drills and jackhammers. 1984 also saw the first release of a best-of and rarities compilation, Strategies Against Architecture '80–'83.

The band's next album, Halber Mensch ("Half Man") in 1985, may be seen as a developmental breakthrough. Musical structure became more evident, and Bargeld's lyrics and, especially, his singing changed. He moved from shouted words and phrases toward organized, poetic melodies.

The band played a show in Vancouver, Canada, to kick off its third North American tour. The performance was sponsored by the German Goethe Institute as part of the German contribution to Expo 86. Also scheduled to appear were Test Dept and Skinny Puppy, though not everyone was able to play.

On the tour, the group's experimental and improvised live performance style occasionally caused difficulties with venue management and law enforcement. A performance at The Palladium in Manhattan ended after an improvised pyrotechnics display. The band ignited lighter fluid in a couple of metal pans, and management stopped the performance and cleared the venue.

The one-hour film Halber Mensch (1986) by Sōgo Ishii documents Einstürzende Neubauten's visit to Japan in 1985. The next two albums, Fünf auf der nach oben offenen Richterskala ("Five on the open-ended Richterscale") in 1987 and Haus der Lüge ("House of the Lie") in 1989, were great successes in the United States and Japan.

=== 1990s ===
In 1990, the band tried something completely new, recording the soundtrack for East German playwright Heiner Müller's play Die Hamletmaschine ("The Hamlet Machine") for East German radio Rundfunk der DDR. The band image of Einstürzende Neubauten changed: Blixa Bargeld, formerly wearing punk/industrial style clothes, appeared at the live concerts in a suit.

1991 also saw the release of the double album, a best-of and rarities album, Strategies Against Architecture II. This collection included a musical setting of Heiner Müller's piece Bildbeschreibung ("Explosion of a Memory" or "Description of a Picture").

In Vienna, May 1992, Einstürzende Neubauten performed at The Academy of Fine Arts' 300th anniversary in a show by Erich Wonder, Das Auge des Taifun ("The eye of the typhoon").

The next album, Tabula Rasa (1993), was an important turning point in the band's history, the music becoming softer and containing more electronic sounds.

In 1993, the band was booked to support U2 during the European leg of the Zoo TV Tour, but were thrown off the stage and off the tour when a band member threw an iron bar into the booing crowd.

Mark Chung left the band in 1994 after the recording of Faustmusik for Werner Schwab's play, and made a career in the music industry. F.M. Einheit, who contributed much to the music and sound of the band, left the band a short time later in 1995, during the recording of the Ende Neu album, at least partially because of a conflict with Bargeld. The last Einstürzende Neubauten track Einheit worked on was Was ist ist. Roland Wolf replaced them on bass guitar and keyboards only a short time before dying in a car accident in 1995.

A short time later, the band released the album Ende Neu ("Ending New") in 1996. The title is wordplay on the band's own name (i.e. "Einstürzende Neubauten"). The song Stella Maris – a duet between Bargeld and Hacke's then-wife, singer Meret Becker – became quite famous; a world tour followed the release. During this time, Jochen Arbeit and Rudolph Moser (both members of Die Haut) joined the band: Arbeit on guitar, and Moser on drums, with Hacke switching to bass guitar. This lineup, accompanied by Ash Wednesday on keyboards for live concerts, held until 2025.

Alternative Press included Einstürzende Neubauten in their 1996 list of "100 underground inspirations of the past 20 years."

In 1997, the album Ende Neu Remixes was released, which featured remixes of the songs from Ende Neu by artists such as Barry Adamson, Pan Sonic and Darkus (alias Mark Rutherford); Darkus's remix tracks, with others not included on Ende Neu Remixes, were made available separately in the same year on The NNNAAAMMM Remixes By Darkus release.

=== 2000s ===
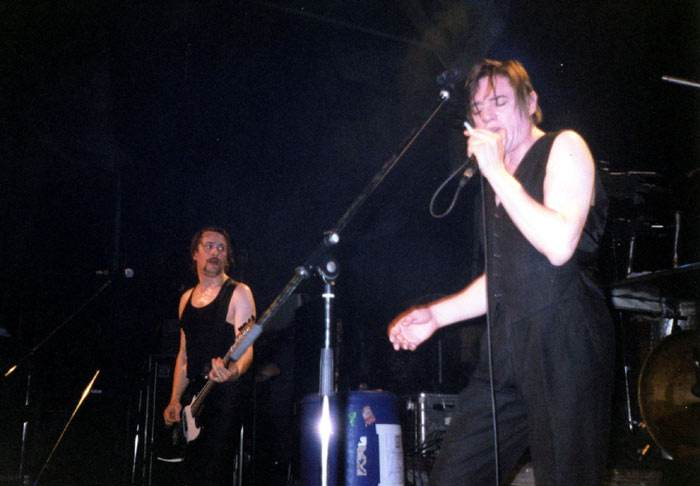
Live at "Tollhaus" in Karlsruhe, May 2000: Alexander Hacke (left) and Blixa Bargeld (right)

From 27 March to 23 May 2000, Einstürzende Neubauten celebrated their 20th birthday with a "20th anniversary tour", playing in the Columbiahalle, Berlin on its birthday, 1 April, and released the album Silence Is Sexy, followed by a world tour. 2001 also saw the release of another double best-of and rarities album, Strategies Against Architecture III.

Since 2001, Einstürzende Neubauten albums and web projects have been partially produced and supported by Bargeld's wife, Erin Zhu, who also serves as webmaster of Einstürzende Neubauten's website.

In 2002, Einstürzende Neubauten began work on a new album without the backing of a record label, relying instead upon fan ("supporter") participation in an experiment of a type of Street Performer Protocol combined with an internet community and touches of the patronage system. An exclusive Supporter Album No. 1, and the Airplane Miniatures EP following, were made available in 2003.

Bargeld left Nick Cave and the Bad Seeds in 2003. In order to go on tour, the band reneged on the idea of creating a supporter-only album, and cooperated with Mute Records to go on tour and release Perpetuum Mobile in 2004. Air sounds, such as blowing the plastic pipes with an air compressor, were greatly explored and used for this album: the working title of the album was, for a long while, Luftveränderung ("Change of air"). A half-hour documentary about the supporters project, Traumfestival, was made by Ste van Holm and Dihcar, and is available on YouTube.

The live shows of the Perpetuum Mobile Tour were recorded by the band's sound engineers, then burned on CDRs with individual pictures of each show taken by Danielle de Picciotto and sold directly after the concerts; numerous "official" live albums were created during this tour as a result.

In November 2004, the band went on a mini-tour, which included a supporters-only performance at Berlin's Palast der Republik. The performance was filmed and coordinated by Danielle de Picciotto and Ian Williamson and released on the exclusive supporter's DVD at the end of Phase II.

The band also started a new project called Musterhaus in early 2005. The first CD, Anarchitektur, was sent out in May 2005, and was also available for download to Musterhaus subscribers. The Musterhaus project was a "line of releases intended to give the band an outlet for more experimental impulses and exploration." Musterhaus albums were released roughly every 3 months.

The second Musterhaus CD, Unglaublicher Lärm ("Incredible noise"), was finished on 15 August, and shipped out (as well as posted for download) shortly after.

Phase II of the Neubauten Supporter's project finished in August 2005, and the official site was taken down on 20 September. The supporter album Grundstück ("Plot of Land") and DVD (containing footage from the November 2004 Grundstück performance in Berlin) was shipped in early October 2005.

Musterhaus No. 3 Solo Bassfeder ("Solo bass-spring"), released 8 December, is a collection of bass spring compositions by the individual members of Einstürzende Neubauten.

Phase III of the Supporter's project started on 10 February. On 25 February, the fourth part of the Musterhaus series, Redux Orchestra versus Einstürzende Neubauten, was completed. One of the new additions to Phase III started in March 2006 was a piece-by-piece album, Jewels, finally finished in August 2007.

Danielle de Picciotto, Alexander Hacke's wife and longtime companion, released the DVD documentary Einstürzende Neubauten - On tour with neubauten.org which describes the supporter project in detail, having interviewed international supporters during the Perpetuum Mobile tour in 2004.

Musterhaus No. 5 Kassetten ("Cassettes"), finished 15 May with release scheduled for 31 May. At the same time, Alles was irgendwie nützt ("Everything of any use"), an album that had been in the work since Phase 2, were completed. The album consists of rare live tracks, handpicked by 6 supporters of Phase 2 and mixed by Boris Wilsdorf. This was quickly followed by Musterhaus No. 6 Klaviermusik ("Piano music"), released on 31 August.

In October, Neubauten released a public DVD, the recording made at Palast der Republik.

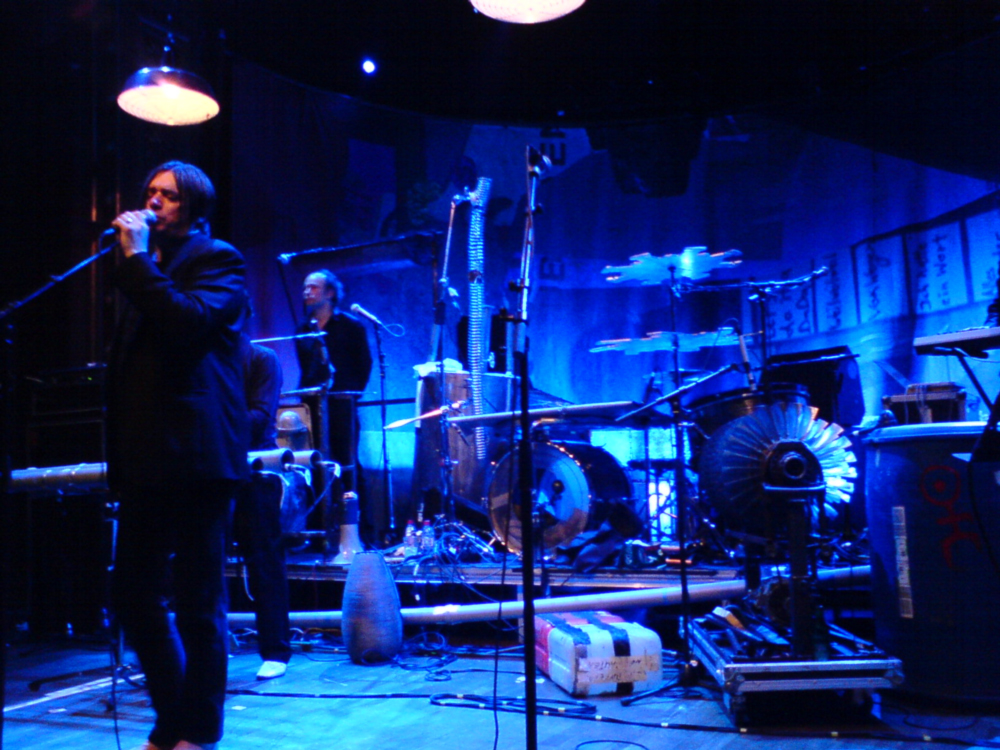
Live at "Berns" in Stockholm, April 2008: Blixa Bargeld (left) and N.U. Unruh (centre-left)

Musterhaus No. 7 Stimmen Reste ("Voice Remainders") was released on 2 December, consisting of vocal experiments, vocal recordings, and manipulations of voice recordings, enriched with leftover instrumental tracks made with polystyrene, electronic pulses, Hammond organ, bass guitar, and metal percussion.

It was announced on the band's website that it would be undertaking a "small (mostly) UK tour" in April 2007, but playing in Hanover on 22 April beforehand. Musterhaus No. 8 Weingeister ("Wine spirits") was released on 6 April, forming the final installment of the Musterhaus series.

A new commercial album was made available later in the year, the first release since 2004's Perpetuum Mobile. The new album, Alles wieder offen ("All open again"), was released in 2007 without the backing of a label, a move the band had intended to make with Perpetuum Mobile. Fans who were part of the paid EN community at neubauten.org received access to an album with the same tracks plus a number of extra songs, and an optional DVD about the making of the album. The band also filmed a video for "Nagorny Karabach". They spent the first half of 2008 touring for the album, playing 32 dates in 19 European countries.

=== 2010s and 2020s ===
Einstürzende Neubauten celebrated its 30th anniversary in 2010 with a tour through Europe. An American leg was also planned, but eventually cancelled due to visa scheduling problems. Silence Is Sexy was reissued on 1 July 2011. In November 2014 the group released album Lament, a studio reconstruction of a performance piece commissioned by the Belgian town of Diksmuide to commemorate the outbreak of World War I.

The album Alles in Allem was released in May 2020 as the group's first full-length release of new material since 2014. A tour dubbed The Year of the Rat Tour was planned for 2020 to support the album's release, but was postponed to 2022 due to the COVID-19 pandemic, being renamed The Year of the Tiger Tour. The tour's names were based on the animals associated with the tour's year in the Chinese calendar.

In January 2023, the group announced the Rampen Phase of its Supporter's project on its website, introducing the idea of repurposing improvisations from the previous tour into a full album. The album was originally planned to release in autumn of the same year, but was officially announced to release in the spring of 2024 on 24 December 2023. The album was released in early April 2024. The single Ist Ist was also released prior to the album and the autumn 2024 alien pop music tour was announced, with concerts in Europe scheduled.

On April 25 2025, long-time member Alexander Hacke announced that he had left Einstürzende Neubauten, citing differences in "basic standards, personally and professionally" between the band's members.

On March 24 2026, a post pronouncing Josefine Lukschy as the new bass player of the band was published on the band’s official Instagram account. The post stated that the band personnel welcomes her and showed a clip of Lukschy playing a bassline of Die Befindlichkeit des Landes song, first published in 2000.

== Band name and logo ==
The band name is usually translated into English as "Collapsing New Buildings". Neubauten ("new buildings") is a general term referring to buildings constructed in Germany after 1945. These are often regarded as cheaper, flimsier, and less aesthetically attractive than Altbauten, or pre-1945, especially pre-modernist buildings. Due to the extensive destruction throughout Germany during the Second World War, and the extensive rebuilding thereafter, Neubauten constitute a very familiar element of German cities.

The band's name attracted unexpected attention when on 21 May 1980, not two months after the band's forming, the roof of the Berlin Congress Hall famously collapsed, killing one person and injuring many. The resulting media attention surrounding the collapse of the German-American icon gave the meaning of their name a new dimension.

The Einstürzende Neubauten logo is an appropriation by the band of an archaic ideogram or petroglyph. It appears to be a stick figure with a circled dot or sol as its head. The provenance of the logo has been attributed to the sacred ring of Stonehenge, or possibly to an Olmec Native American cave, and most directly in one source to ancient Chinese origins.

The band logo, sourced from prehistoric art based on a petroglyph cave drawing

The logo is placed on all of the band's official products, such as vinyl/CD/DVD covers, posters, artwork, and memorabilia. The logo is copyrighted by the band. Blixa Bargeld said that by re-purposing a Toltec petroglyph, whose meaning was purposefully undefined, as their band logo, it would be "filled" with meaning later.

== Influences and legacy ==
Einstürzende Neubauten are regarded as industrial pioneers due to their harsh, noise-influenced sound. The band was heavily influenced by the Krautrock movement of the early 70s in Germany, specifically Can, Neu! and Kraftwerk, as well as the German rock band Ton Steine Scherben, who Bargeld cited as, "The only true German rock band."

Einstürzende Neubauten has been regarded as or directly cited as an influence on Ministry, Swans, KMFDM, and Crisis. Trent Reznor of Nine Inch Nails cited the group as a notable influence, while they have been cited as an influence on Depeche Mode's adoption of industrial influences on Construction Time Again.

The band's song Armenia would later be used in the films Heat and The Insider.

== Members ==
=== Current members ===
- Blixa Bargeld – lead vocals, guitars, keyboards, organ, piano, custom-made instruments (1980–present)
- N.U. Unruh – drums, percussion, backing vocals, custom-made instruments (1980–present)
- Jochen Arbeit – guitars, backing vocals, custom-made instruments (1997–present)
- Rudolph Moser – drums, percussion, backing vocals, custom-made instruments (1997–present)
- Josefine Lukschy – bass guitar, backing vocals, custom-made instruments (2026–present)

=== Current touring musicians ===
- Felix Gebhard – keyboards (2014–present)

=== Former members ===
- Beate Bartel – bass guitar (1980)
- Gudrun Gut – keyboards (1980)
- Mark Chung – bass guitar, vocals (1981–1994)
- Roland Wolf – keyboards, bass guitar (1995; his death)
- F.M. Einheit – percussion, vocals (1981–1995)
- Alexander Hacke – bass guitar, guitars, vibraphone, vocals, custom-made instruments (1981–2025)

=== Former touring musicians ===
- Ash Wednesday – keyboards, electronics (1997–2013)

=== Other personnel ===
- Boris Wilsdorf – sound engineer
- Erin Zhu – executive producer
- Ari Benjamin Meyers – frequent collaborator, with Redux Orchestra and on piano
- Danielle de Picciotto – filmmaker

== Discography ==
=== Cassette ===
- Stahlmusik (1980)

=== Studio albums ===
- Kollaps (1981)
- Zeichnungen des Patienten O. T. (1983)
- Halber Mensch (1985)
- Fünf auf der nach oben offenen Richterskala (1987)
- Haus der Lüge (1989)
- Tabula Rasa (1993)
- Ende Neu (1996)
- Silence Is Sexy (2000)
- Perpetuum Mobile (2004)
- Alles wieder offen (2007)
- Lament (2014)
- Alles in Allem (2020)
- Rampen (apm: alien pop music) (2024)

=== EPs ===
- Thirsty Animal (Einstürzende Neubauten & Lydia Lunch), 1982
- Interim (1993)
- Malediction (1993)
- Total Eclipse of the Sun (1999)

=== Soundtracks ===
- Die Hamletmaschine (play, 1991)
- Faustmusik (play, 1996)
- Berlin Babylon (documentary film, 2001)

=== Singles ===
- Für den Untergang (1980)
- Kalte Sterne (1981)
- Thirsty Animal (1982) (with Lydia Lunch & Rowland S. Howard)
- "Yü-Gung" (1985)
- Das Schaben (1985)
- "Feurio!" (1989) (3-inch disc)
- "Nag Nag Nag/Wüste" (1993) (3-inch disc available only with book Einstürzende Neubauten)
- "Stella Maris" (1996)
- "NNNAAAMMM - Remixes by Darkus" (1997)
- "Total Eclipse of the Sun" (2000)
- "Perpetuum Mobile" (2004) (download-only release)
- "Weil Weil Weil" (2007) (download-only release)
- "Ten Grand Goldie" (2020) (download-only release)
- "La Guillotine de Magritte" (2020)
- "Ist Ist" (2024)

=== Collections ===
- Stahldubversions (1982)
- Strategies Against Architecture '80–'83 (1984)
- Tri-Set (1994)
- Ende Neu Remixes (1997)
- Strategies Against Architecture II (1991)
- Strategies Against Architecture III (2001)
- Kalte Sterne -early recordings- (2004)
- Strategies Against Architecture IV (2010)
- Greatest Hits (2016)

=== Live albums ===
- 1981/1982 Livematerial (1982)
- 2X4 (1984) (live album)
- 09-15-2000, Brussels (2001)
- Gemini (2003)
- Perpetuum Mobile Tour (2004)
- 04-01-2004, Amsterdam (2004)
- 10-29-2004, Reggio Emilia (2004)
- 25th Anniversary Tour (2005)
- 04-07-2005, Brussels (2005)
- 04-22-2007, Hannover (2007)
- 04-24-2007, London (2007)
- Palast der Republik (2007)

=== Neubauten.org Supporters Project ===
- Supporter Album No. 1 (2003)
- Airplane Miniatures (2003)
- Grundstück (2005)
- Alles was irgendwie nützt (2006)
- Jewels (2006–2007)
- Grundstück (2018)

=== Musterhaus Series ===
- Anarchitektur (2005)
- Unglaublicher Laerm (2005)
- Solo Bassfeder (2005)
- Redux Orchestra versus Einstürzende Neubauten (2006)
- Kassetten (2006)
- Klaviermusik (2006)
- Stimmen Reste (2006)
- Weingeister (2007)

=== Appeared on ===
- Decoder (1984)
- Heat (1995)
- The Island of Dr. Moreau (1996)
- The Life of David Gale (soundtrack) (2002)
- The Collector (soundtrack) (2009)

=== Videos ===
- Halber Mensch (1985)
- Liebeslieder (1993)
- Stella Maris (1996)
- 20th Anniversary Concert (2000)
- Listen with Pain: 20 Years of Einstürzende Neubauten (2000)
- On Tour with Neubauten.org (2004)
- Grundstück (DVD, 2005)
- Palast der Republik (DVD, 2006)
- Elektrokohle (von wegen) (2009)

== See also ==
- Industrial music
- Industrial percussion
