= Mark Chung (musician) =

German musician and music publisher

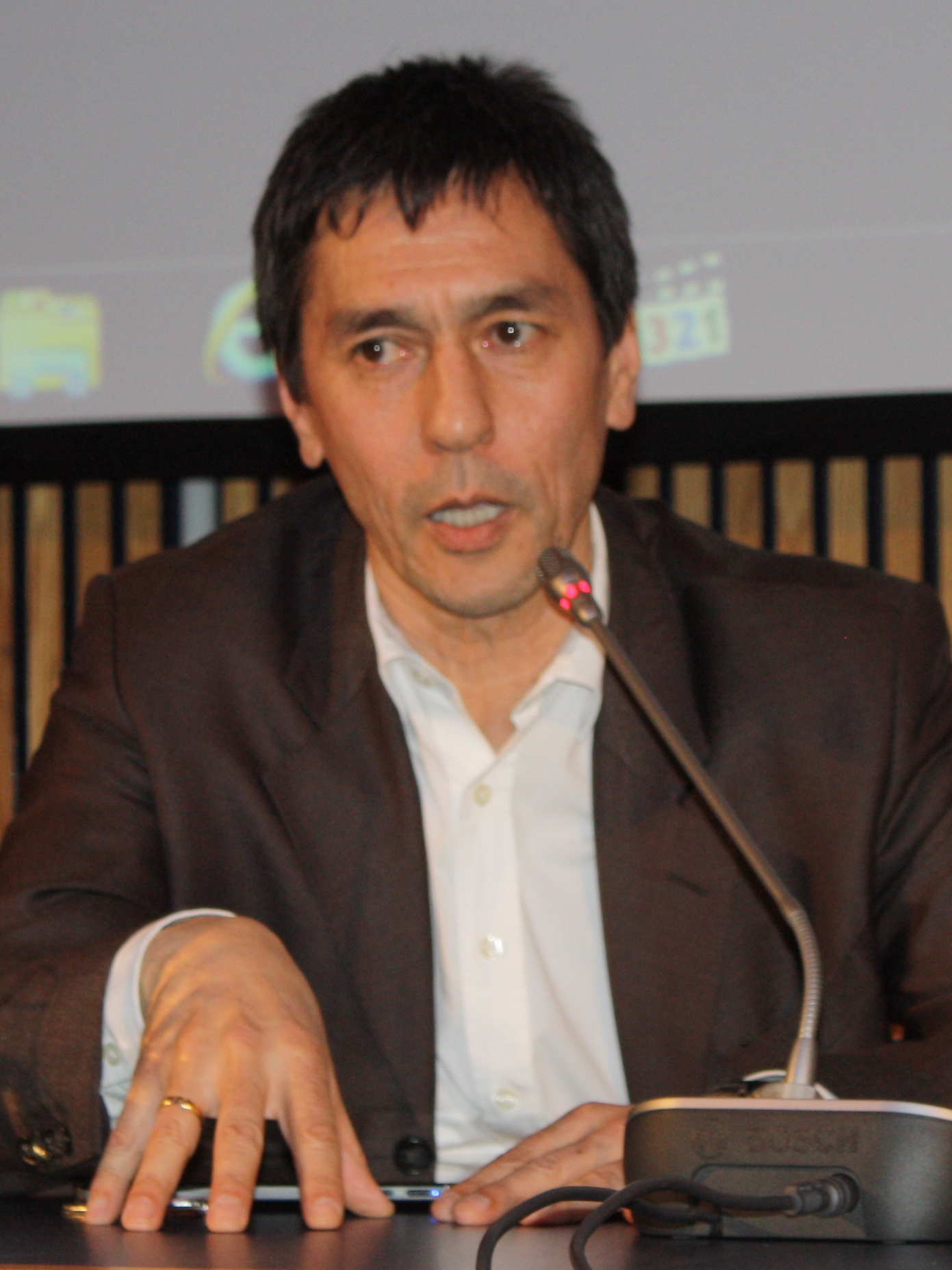
- Chung in 2012

Background information
- Born: 3 June 1957 (age 69)
- Origin: Leeds, England
- Occupations: Musician; music publisher
- Instrument: Bass guitar
- Years active: 1980–present
- Formerly of: Abwärts; Einstürzende Neubauten
- Website: freibank.com

Mark Chung (born 3 June 1957) is a British-born German musician and music publisher, best known for his work as the bass guitarist of the German band Einstürzende Neubauten in the 1980s and 90s.

== Biography ==
Chung was born on 3 June 1957 in Leeds, England. He is of German and Chinese descent, and grew up in England, Jamaica, and Germany.

From 1980, Chung was a member of the West German post-punk band Abwärts from Hamburg. He joined Einstürzende Neubauten in 1981. He assumed responsibility for business management of the band until leaving in 1994 to concentrate on his work in the music industry.

He formed Freibank Music Publishing in 1986, initially for controlling and administering the copyrights of Einstürzende Neubauten, but Freibank also offered this service to other musicians and steadily grew.

In 1996, Chung moved to London, where he became senior vice-president of Sony Music International. After nine years with Sony Music, he moved back to Germany and now directs the Freibank office in Berlin. In 2006, he was elected chairman of the German association of independent music companies (Verband unabhängiger Musikunternehmen – VUT) and he also sits on the board of the public-private partnership Initiative Musik.

Chung is married and has two sons and a daughter.
