= Alexander Hacke =

German musician

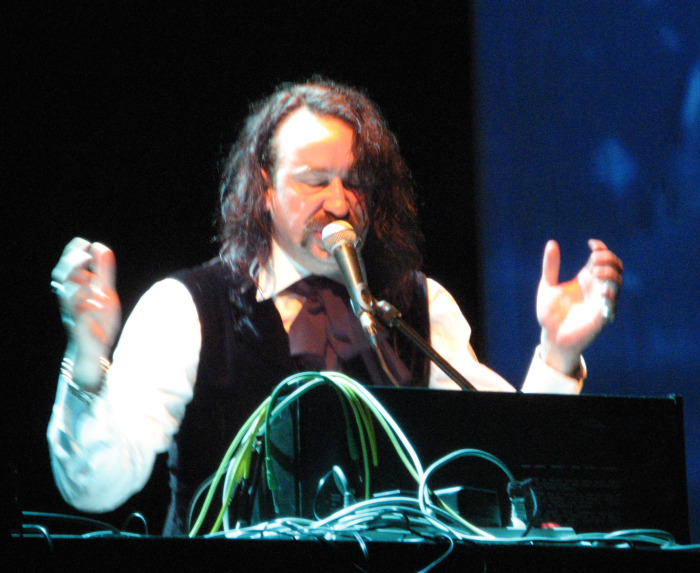
- Hacke in 2007

Background information
- Also known as: Alex Hacke
- Born: Alexander von Borsig; 11 October 1965 (age 60); West Berlin, West Germany
- Genres: Experimental, industrial, electronic
- Occupations: Musician, record producer, composer
- Instruments: Vocals, bass, guitar
- Years active: 1980–present
- Website: hacke.org

Alexander Hacke (also known as Alexander von Borsig, Alex Hacke, and simply Hacke, born 11 October 1965) is a German guitarist, bass guitarist, singer, musician, record producer, writer and filmmaker. He is primarily known as a longtime member of the influential German industrial music group Einstürzende Neubauten.

Hacke has released two full-length solo albums, and has also collaborated with many other artists, such as Robert Rutman, The Tiger Lillies, Danielle de Picciotto, FM Einheit, Crime & the City Solution, Phew, Gianna Nannini, Gry, Miranda Sex Garden, Terranova, Sprung aus den Wolken, Wovenhand, David Yow, Mona Mur, Die Ichs, Schlaflose Naechte, Fred Alpi and others. Since 2010, his main band next to Einstürzende Neubauten is hackedepicciotto together with Danielle de Picciotto.

== Biography ==
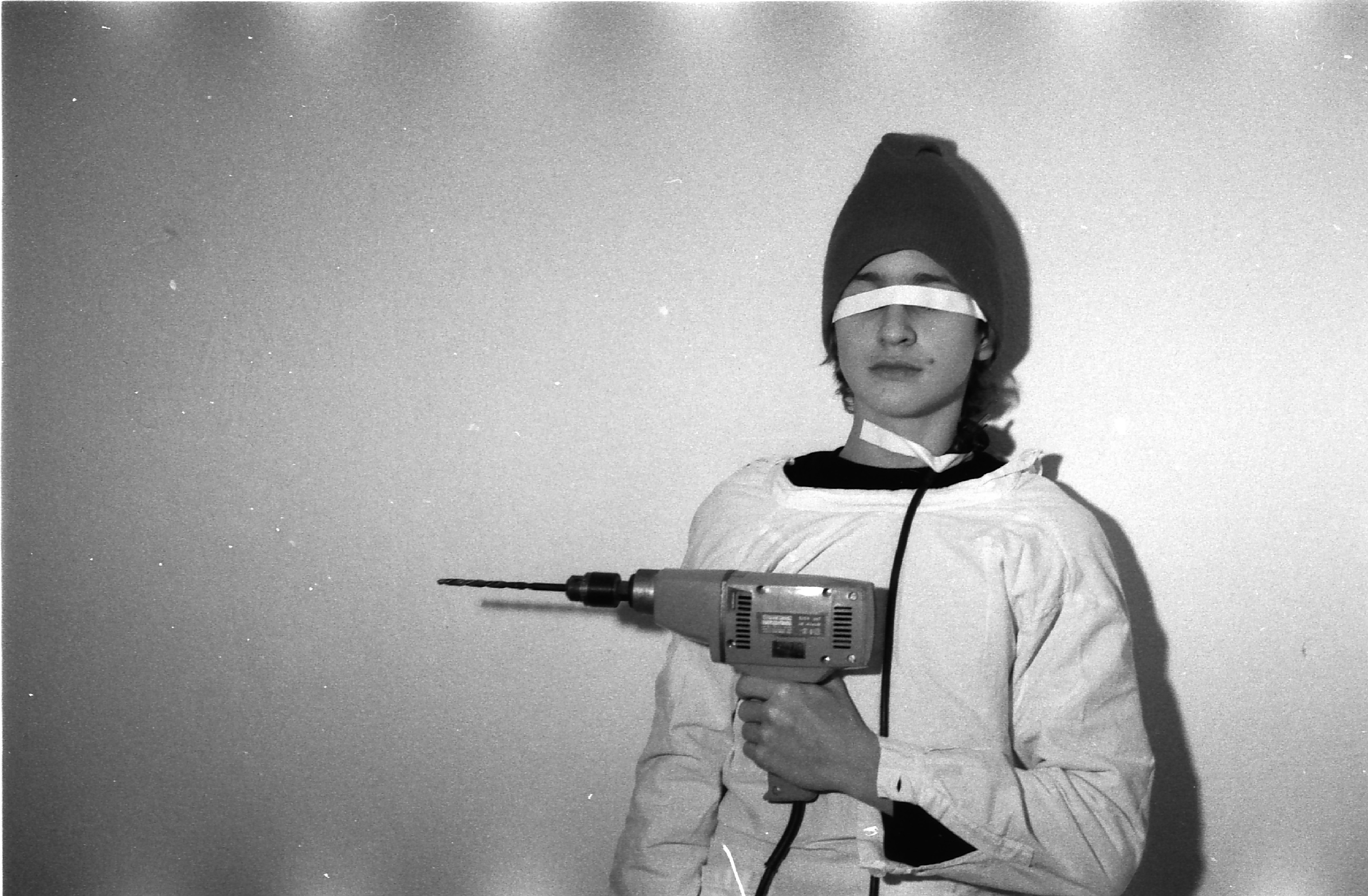
Hacke during the "Blässe" ("paleness") project, c. 1980

=== Early years ===
In the early 1980s, Hacke released a few solo tapes and mini-albums, such as Hiroshima. He became a long-time member of Einstürzende Neubauten and also was a member of several other bands, such as Sentimentale Jugend (with Christiane Vera Felscherinow, also known as Christiane F.), Sprung aus den Wolken and Mona Mur.

=== Einstürzende Neubauten ===
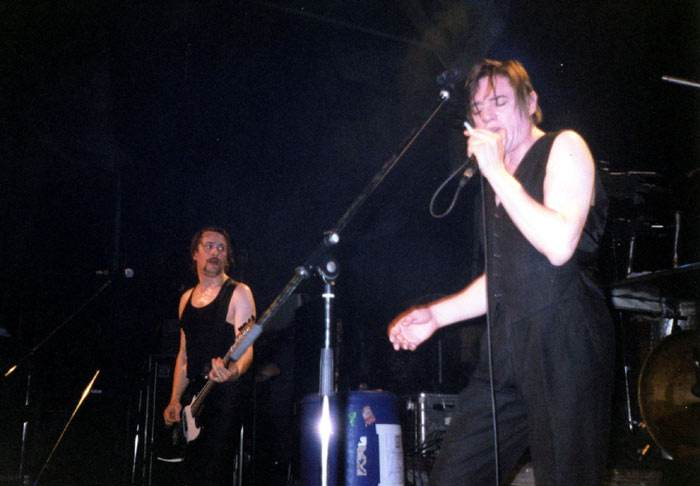
Einstürzende Neubauten live in 2000: Alexander Hacke (left, playing bass) with Blixa Bargeld (right)

In 1980, at the age of fifteen, Hacke joined Einstürzende Neubauten, which had been formed earlier the same year. Hacke played guitar and worked with the band's sound until the mid 1990s. Then he changed from guitar to bass and is now a bass player and, according to band leader Blixa Bargeld, "a musical director of the band".

=== Solo activities ===
Hacke's first full-length solo album was Filmarbeiten (1992).

In the 1990s, he was frontman of the band Jever Mountain Boys, who played their favorite songs, particularly country music cover-versions.

In 2003, Alexander Hacke and his longtime partner Danielle de Picciotto (married since 2006) organized the monthly event "BadaBing" in the famous Berlin 70s Club "Big Eden", presenting new and unusual bands and in this way initiating a new wave of Berlin-oriented "Futur-electroclash" music all over Europe. They travel extensively performing multimedia shows together and presenting workshops on Berlin underground culture. In 2004, Danielle de Picciotto produced a documentary on Einstürzende Neubauten for which Alexander Hacke did the sound design.

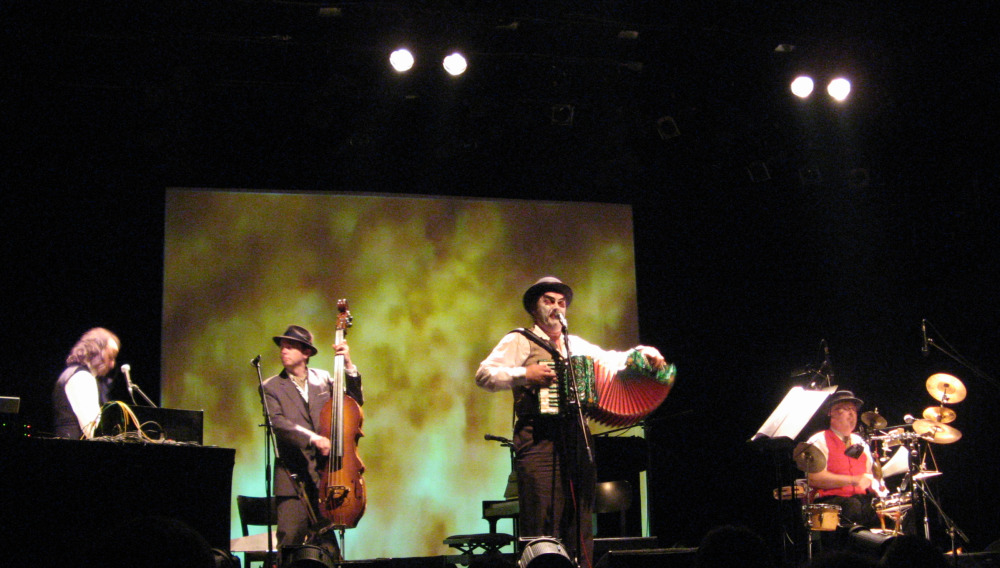
Hacke & Tiger Lillies & Danielle de Picciotto live with "The Mountains of Madness" (2007)

In 2005, Hacke and de Picciotto conceived and directed "The Mountains of Madness", an audio/visual live show based on stories by H. P. Lovecraft, inviting the English Trio The Tiger Lillies to participate and perform in the successful production throughout Europe.

In the 2000s, Hacke created the album Sanctuary (released in 2005), travelling with a mobile recorder in Europe and North America and collaborating with numerous artists, such as J.G.Thirlwell (Foetus), Caspar Brötzmann, Larry Mullins (also known as Toby Dammit), Vinnie Signorelli (Unsane), Michael Evans (KBZ 200), Sugarpie Jones (Celebrity Skin), Bob Rutman (Steel Cello Ensemble), Nils Wohlrabe (The Leather Nun), Gianna Nannini, Andrew Chudy (alias N.U. Unruh, Einstürzende Neubauten), Lary 7 (The Analog Society), and David Yow (The Jesus Lizard). In the reviews on this album Hacke was compared to Frank Zappa and Captain Beefheart. The "Road Record", an excerpt of which can be seen on Sanctuary, was documented by de Picciotto, describing the revolutionary recording style Hacke used to produce the record.

Hacke also contributed to several soundtracks to such films as Sonnenallee and Das Wilde Leben (biography of Uschi Obermaier, 2006/07). Hacke produced music for Fatih Akın's film Head-On (2004) and is a main character in Crossing the Bridge: The Sound of Istanbul (2005), Akın's documentary of the Istanbul music scene.

On several occasions he reunited on stage with FM Einheit (ex-Einstürzende Neubauten) for an experimental performance.

== Personal life ==
Hacke's first noteworthy girlfriend was Christiane F., who became famous with the book Zoo Station: The Story of Christiane F., a biography of her heroin addiction, and its film adaptation Christiane F. They performed together in Europe and the US with their band Sentimentale Jugend and also appeared together in the movie Decoder in 1983.

On 3 October 1989, Hacke's son Joshua was born in Berlin. His mother is Angela Mettbach, a Berlin nightlife figure who had a short-lived musical career with her band Octopussy.

Hacke was briefly married to German actress and singer Meret Becker and was involved in her musical career. Becker guested on Einstürzende Neubauten's album Ende Neu. In 2006, Hacke married his longtime partner Danielle de Picciotto, an American Berlin-based multimedia artist who is known for having founded the Berlin Love Parade together with Dr Motte and for singing in the band Space Cowboys.

== Solo discography ==
- 1980: Das Leben ist schön
- 1981: Borsig-Werke
- 1982: Christiane F.: Wunderbar (Mitarbeit)
- 1982: Hiroshima
- 1982: Mona Mur und die Mieter: Jeszcze Polska
- 1988: Crime and the City Solution: Shine
- 1989: Crime and the City Solution: The Bride Ship
- 1990: Crime and the City Solution: Paradise Discotheque
- 1992: Phew: Our Likeness (Musiker)
- 1992: Filmarbeiten
- 1994: Jever Mountain Boys: Bury the Bottle with Me
- 1994: Gianna Nannini: Dispetto (Mitarbeit)
- 1994: Die Haut: Sweat (Mitarbeit)
- 1995: Blind: Live Saver (Produzent)
- 1995: Miranda Sex Garden: Fairytales About Slavery (Produzent)
- 1998: Meret Becker: Nachtmahr (Produzent, Musiker)
- 1999: Terranova: Close the Door (Mitarbeit)
- 2001: Fieber – Tagebuch eines Aussätzigen, Gedichte von Klaus Kinski, rezitiert von Ben Becker, Musik von Alexander Hacke
- 2002: Fred Alpi: Les chiens mangent les chiens (Produzent)
- 2005: Sanctuary
- 2005: Martin Dean: The Best of Martin Dean (Mitarbeit)
- 2006: Mountains of Madness together with Tiger Lillies & Danielle de Picciotto (DVD)
- 2006: "I Hate You" for the Monks-Tribute-CD Silver Monk Time
- 2008: "The Ship of Fools" in collaboration with Danielle de Picciotto (DVD/CD)
- 2009: "Doomed"
- 2010: "Hitman's Heel" in collaboration with Danielle de Picciotto
- 2013: "American Twilight" Crime & The City Solution, MUTE Records
- 2014: "Ministry of Wolves" in collaboration with Mick Harvey, Danielle de Picciotto,
- 2016: "Perseverantia", Album (CD/LP) with Danielle de Picciotto
- 2017: "Unity – Meditation Soundtrack", Album (CD) with Danielle de Picciotto
- 2018: "Menetekel", Album (CD/LP) with Danielle de Picciotto as hackedepicciotto
- 2018: "Joy – Meditation Soundtrack", Album (CD) as hackedepicciotto with Eric Hubel and Vincent Signorelli
- 2020: "THE CURRENT", Album (CD/LP) with Danielle de Picciotto as hackedepicciotto
- 2021: "The Silver Threshold", Album (CD) with Danielle de Picciotto as hackedepicciotto
- 2023: "Keepsakes", Album (CD/LP) with Danielle de Picciotto as hackedepicciotto

For discography of Alexander Hacke with Einstürzende Neubauten, see: Einstürzende Neubauten's discography (all releases).

== Film soundtracks ==
- 1988 Nihil, oder alle Zeit der Welt, directed by Uli M Schueppel
- 1990 A Priori, directed by Uli M Schueppel
- 1992 Vaterland, directed by Uli M Schueppel, together with Mick Harvey
- 2000 Planet Alex, directed by Uli M Schueppel, together with Mick Harvey
- 2004: Gegen die Wand (Filmmusik), directed by Fatih Akın
- 2005: Crossing The Bridge: The Sound Of Istanbul (Dokumentarfilm), directed by Fatih Akın
- 2007: Das wilde Leben, directed by Achim Bornhak
- 2007: Fuori dalle corde, directed by Fulvio Bernasconi
- 2009: Elektrokohle – Von Wegen (Darsteller und Filmmusik), directed by Uli M Schueppel
- 2009: Kaifeck Murder, directed by Esther Gronenborn
- 2009: Last Cowboy Standing, directed by Zaida Bergroth
- 2010: Empire Me: New Worlds Are Happening!, directed by Paul Poet
- 2011: Lollipop Monster, directed by Ziska Riemann
- 2012: Polluting Paradise, directed by Fatih Akin
- 2015: The Cut, directed by Fatih Akin
- 2018: "Iuventa" directed by Michele Cinque, together with Danielle de Picciotto
- 2018: "Zersetzt" directed by HansJörg Thurn, together with Danielle de Picciotto

== DVD ==
- 2006 The Mountains of Madness (with The Tiger Lillies and Danielle de Picciotto)
- 2008 Ship Of Fools (with Danielle de Picciotto)
- 2009 "In Berlin" Documentary by Michael Ballhaus and Ciro Cappellary
- 2010 How Long is Now (with Danielle de Picciotto)

== Audiobook ==
- 2025: Alexander Hacke: “'Krach – Verzerrte Erinnerungen”' (also narrator) – Production: Peter Zirbs. Published by Fabrique Records
