= N.U. Unruh =

German percussionist

N. U. Unruh
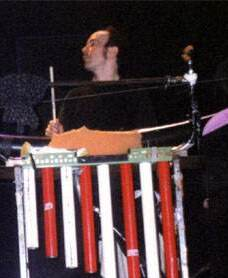
- N. U. Unruh with one of his built instruments (live with Einstürzende Neubauten, 2000)

Background information
- Born: Andrew Chudy; June 9, 1957 (age 68); New York City, U.S.
- Origin: Germany
- Occupation: Musician
- Instruments: Drums, percussion, various custom instruments
- Years active: 1980s–present
- Member of: Einstürzende Neubauten

Andrew Chudy (June 9, 1957), known professionally as N. U. Unruh, is a German musician, experimental percussionist, and instrument inventor, best known for his work with Einstürzende Neubauten.

== Biography ==
In 1980, Unruh co-founded the German experimental band Einstürzende Neubauten, together with his school friend Blixa Bargeld. Both are still band members. Unruh usually plays self-constructed percussion instruments.

In 2000, Unruh released a solo album, Euphorie im Zeitalter der digitalen Informationsübertragung ("Euphoria in the era of digital data transfer").

He is also a member of the band Bombus (not be confused with the Swedish band of the same name), which describes itself as "electronic dance music combined with drummers, performers, and DJs".

In 2004, Unruh released a DVD, 12 Ambiences Airshow.

== Discography ==
Einstürzende Neubauten
See Einstürzende Neubauten discography

Solo discography

- 2000 Euphorie im Zeitalter der digitalen Informationsübertragung
- 2004 12 Ambiences Airshow
