= F.M. Einheit =

German musician & actor

- Also known as: Mufti
- Born: Frank Martin Strauß; 18 December 1958 (age 67)
- Origin: Dortmund, West Germany
- Occupations: Composer, musician, percussionist, actor
- Instrument: Percussion
- Years active: 1980s–present
- Website: fmeinheit.org

Frank-Martin Strauß, better known as F.M. Einheit and also known as Mufti, (born 18 December 1958) is German musician and actor, known for his work in industrial and electronic music.

While primarily known for his work with the influential group Einstürzende Neubauten as a percussionist using self-designed custom instruments, Strauß has also collaborated with KMFDM, Goethes Erben and recorded several albums in collaboration with other musicians (such as Diamanda Galás, Mona Mur, Andreas Ammer, Ulrike Haage) and solo. Einheit was also involved in the projects Stein and Gry.

== Early years ==
Strauß was born in Dortmund. In the late 1970s and early 1980s he was also a member of the punk bands Abwärts from Hamburg and Palais Schaumburg.

In the early 1980s he joined Einstürzende Neubauten as a percussionist and became a long-time band member. Most of the percussions which FM Einheit played on were custom-made metal instruments or such tools as a hammer drill. FM Einheit was instrumental to the development of the group's sound.

Live performances of Einstürzende Neubauten with FM Einheit included much metal banging, destruction on the stage and even fire. These shows became legendary and influenced the band image.

He played the lead role in the 1984 feature film Klaus Maeck's Decoder, a cyberpunk critique of muzak. In 1988–9 he was part of Alfred 23 Harth's group Vladimir Estragon.

== 1990s–2000s ==
In the 1990s he was also a member of a band Stein, also featuring Ulrike Haage and Katharina Franck from the band Rainbirds.

FM Einheit left Einstürzende Neubauten in the mid-1990s during work on the album Ende Neu, due to a lack of creative interest.

One of his major projects after Einstürzende Neubauten was the band Gry with a female singer Gry Bagøien from Denmark. They released two albums: The Touch Of E! (1998) and Public Recording (2000, featuring Pan Sonic and Einstürzende Neubauten's Alexander Hacke).

FM Einheit is also involved in theater and radio plays. On several occasions he reunited on stage with Alexander Hacke of Einstürzende Neubauten for an experimental performance.

== Discography ==
- 1990 Stein
- 1992 Steinzeit (Stein: FM Eineit/Ulrike Haage)
- 1993 Prometheus/Lear
- 1993 Radio Inferno (FM Einheit/Andreas Ammer)
- 1994 Königzucker (Stein)
- 1994 Merry Christmas (FM Einheit/Caspar Brötzmann)
- 1995 Apocalypse Live (FM Einheit/Andreas Ammer/Ulrike Haage)
- 1996 Deutsche Krieger (FM Einheit/Andreas Ammer)
- 1996 Sensation Death ([sen'seiʃn deθ])
- 1998 Odysseus 7 (FM Einheit/Andreas Ammer/Ulrike Haage)
- 1998 Goto (Ulrike Haage/Phil Minton/FM Einheit)
- 2000 Frost 79° 40' (FM Einheit/Andreas Ammer/Gry/Pan Sonic, live)
- 2001 Brecht Baal
- 2002 Crashing Aeroplanes (FM Einheit/Andreas Ammer)
- 2006 Echohce (FM Einheit/Jamie Lidell/David Link/Saskia v. Klitzing/Volker Kamp)
- 2008 The Sallie House (Michael Esposito/FM Einheit)
- 2009 No Apologies (FM Einheit/Hans Joachim Irmler)
- 2010 Evol/Ve (FM Einheit/Massimo Pupillo)
- 2011 Spielwiese 3 (Hans Joachim Irmler/FM Einheit/Ute Marie Paul/Katie Young)
- 2013 Terre Haute (Mona Mur/FM Einheit/En Esch)
- 2015 Bestandteil (Hans Joachim Irmler/FM Einheit)
- 2017 Rosebud (Eraldo Bernocchi/FM Einheit/Jo Quail)
- For discography of FM Einheit with Einstürzende Neubauten, see: Einstürzende Neubauten's discography (all releases 1982–1995).
- For discography of FM Einheit with Gry, see: Gry's discography (all releases).

== Film soundtracks ==
- 1984 Decoder, directed by Jürgen Muschalek
- 1997 Der Platz, directed by Uli M Schueppel
- 1997 Im Platz, directed by Uli M Schueppel
- 2008 Der Tag, directed by Uli M Schueppel
- 2009 Die Narbe, Westberlin (West), directed by Burkhard von Harder
