= Blixa Bargeld =

German musician

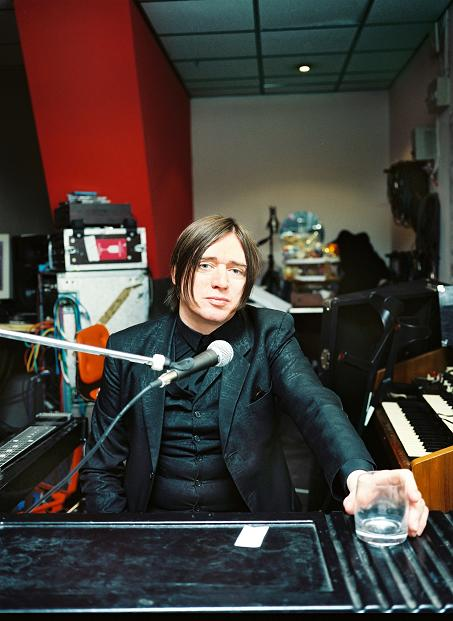
- Bargeld c. 2007

Background information
- Born: Hans Christian Emmerich; 12 January 1959 (age 67); West Berlin, West Germany
- Genres: Industrial; dark ambient; experimental rock
- Occupations: Musician; band leader; solo artist; spoken word artist; actor
- Instruments: Vocals; guitar; bass guitar; keyboards; drums; percussion
- Years active: 1980–present
- Member of: Einstürzende Neubauten; ANBB
- Formerly of: Nick Cave and the Bad Seeds
- Website: blixa-bargeld.com

Hans Christian Emmerich (born 12 January 1959), known professionally as Blixa Bargeld, is a German musician who has been the lead singer of the experimental band Einstürzende Neubauten since its formation in 1980. He was also a founding member of the Australian rock band Nick Cave and the Bad Seeds from 1983 until 2003.

== Early life ==
Bargeld left school prior to completion and is self-taught. He experimented with audio equipment as a teenager, including the disassembling of tape recorders. The first album that he owned was by Pink Floyd, but he quickly moved on to German krautrock acts such as Kraftwerk, Neu! and Can, which he described as his biggest influences at the time.

Bargeld is from the Tempelhof area of West Berlin; he moved out of his parents' home in the late 1970s. A 2008 documentary featured him visiting his mother and talking to her about his childhood and the relationship that he had with his parents.

His name came from Blixa, a popular brand of felt-tip pens and Bargeld, which literally translates to "cash" and also referenced the artist Johannes Theodor Baargeld.

== Career ==
In 1980, Bargeld founded the group Einstürzende Neubauten. Bargeld spoke of the early days of Neubauten in 2010:

The starting point for Neubauten was more that we didn't have anything, so I didn't really have the choice to say "I am doing this, I am doing that, or maybe I should play organ". I didn't have any of these things, and I could not afford any of these things, and neither could anybody else in the group. It was more of the logical consequence of what can we obtain, and that's how it turned out. It certainly didn't start out as an artistic concept to say "let's do something different", it started as an extension of the live situation as it already was.

Around this time, Bargeld became involved with the German film scene, appearing in Kalt wie eis in 1981 and Berlin Now in 1984, performing music in both.

From 1983 to 2003, Bargeld was a guitarist and backing vocalist with Nick Cave and the Bad Seeds. He also sang lead vocals with Cave on several songs, such as "The Carny" and "The Weeping Song". Cave first saw Bargeld performing with Einstürzende Neubauten on TV while the Birthday Party, Cave's band at the time, were touring in Amsterdam. He described the music as "mournful", Bargeld as looking "destroyed", and his screams as "a sound you would expect to hear from strangled cats or dying children".

Bargeld played guitar on the Gun Club song "Yellow Eyes" from their 1987 album Mother Juno. He also played on the album Novice by Alain Bashung in 1989.

Since the mid-1990s, Bargeld has appeared live with his solo Rede/Speech Performances. During these performances, usually supported by Neubauten's sound engineer Boris Wilsdorf, he works with microphones, sound effects, overdubbing with the help of sampler loops and speaks English or German. The performed pieces include a vocal creation of the DNA of an angel and a parody of a techno song.

In 2000 he worked together with Oliver Augst on the music for the plays Rosa Melonen Schnitt Freude based on words by Gertrude Stein and Rom, Blicke by Rolf Dieter Brinkmann, which they also performed together in Italy, Germany and Austria.

In 2007, Bargeld started a collaborative project with Alva Noto (a.k.a. Carsten Nicolai) called ANBB, an abbreviation of Noto's and Bargeld's initials. An EP, Ret Marut Handshake, was released on 26 June 2010, followed later that year by a full-length album Mimikry.

In June 2013, Bargeld collaborated with Italian composer Teho Teardo for an album called Still Smiling, which was released on the Specula record label. A music video for the song "Mi Scusi" was created and an Italian tour was scheduled.

In early October 2014, Neubauten announced 24 November 2014 as the release date for their next album, Lament, described as a "concept album based on a live performance and installation commissioned by the Flemish city of Diksmuide, Belgium to mark the centenary of the start of the First World War in 1914". Bargeld explained in the official press release: "The Second World War is nothing but the elongation of the first one … As a child of the post Second World War era, and the resulting division of Germany and Berlin, I’m of course hugely influenced in my upbringing about the results of that."

Bargeld explained in October 2014 that Neubauten is essentially a materialistic band, leading them to employ two scientific researchers to seek out material to support the development of Lament after the album received financial backing in August 2013. The band opened their 2014 European tour in support of Lament with a performance in Diksmuide, Belgium.

== Instruments ==
Bargeld's guitars of choice are a Fender Jaguar and a Fender Mustang, as seen on the concert DVD God Is in The House and at various media appearances. Initially he used a battered Höfner Model 173 and a red Höfner Colorama II until they "broke down". After his effect pedals were stolen in the early 1980s, he relied exclusively on the Fender floating/dynamic tremolo (like the Höfner units), which both raise and lower pitch, along with Fender Twin amplifiers, metal slides and changing his amp settings for each individual song to create a unique guitar sound.

== Personal life ==
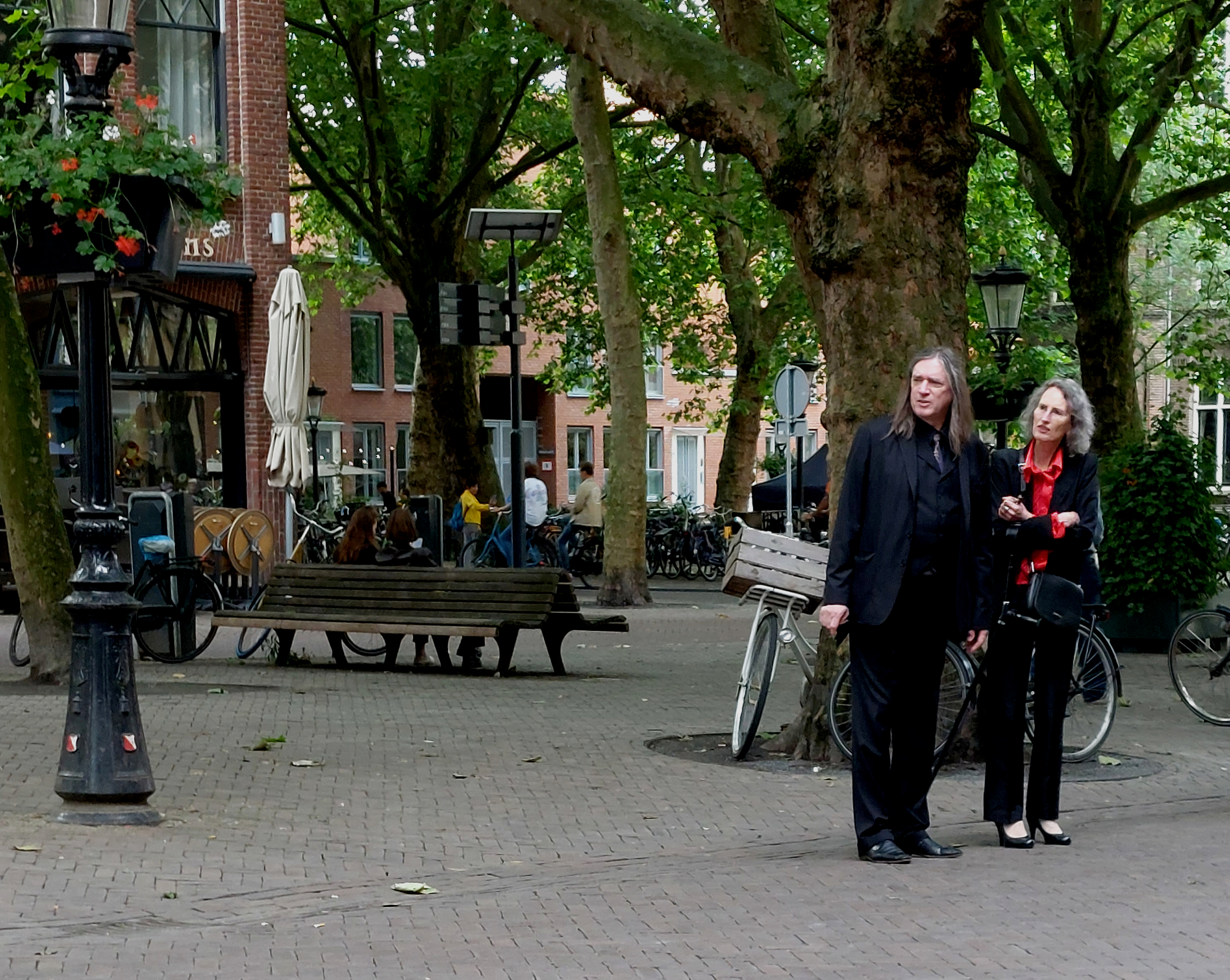
Blixa Bargeld and Karin Spaink

Bargeld is married to Chinese-American mathematician Erin Zhu, daughter of the entrepreneur Min Zhu. Together they developed the concept of web-based fan subscriptions as a new business model for musicians. The couple are featured among 37 other design and media figures in the 2010 book Designing Media by designer and IDEO co-founder Bill Moggridge. The couple reside in San Francisco, Beijing and Berlin. They have a transgender son.

Bargeld was a vegetarian for 30 years, but stopped as a result of difficulties that he encountered while practicing vegetarianism in China.

In a 2024 interview, Bargeld stated that he considered himself queer. He also stated that his wife is the only cisgender person in their family.

== Discography ==
=== Albums ===
- 2010 – Mimikry (with Alva Noto as ANBB; Raster-Noton)
- 2013 – Still Smiling with Teho Teardo (Specula Records)
- 2016 – Nerissimo with Teho Teardo (Specula Records / Rough Trade)
- 2024 – Christian & Mauro with Teho Teardo (Specula/Audioglobe)

=== EPs ===
- 2010 – "Ret Marut Handshake" 12" single (with Noto as ANBB; Raster-Noton)
- 2014 – Spring by Teho Teardo & Blixa Bargeld
- 2017 – Fall by Teho Teardo & Blixa Bargeld
- 2025 – Blixa Bargeld Sings David Bowie by Blixa Bargeld & Nikko Weidemann

=== Soundtrack compilation ===
- 1995 – Commissioned Music
  - Dumpfe stimmen – theatre play (1994)
  - Jahre der kälte – film (1994)

=== Other appearances ===
- 1999 – "Ein gleiches" (from Rosebud: Songs of Goethe and Nietzsche)
- 1999 – "Soul Desert" (from Pop 2000: Das gibt's nur einmal)
- 2000/2001 – "Allein machen sie dich ein" (from Die erben der scherben: Keine macht)
- 2001 – "Bilbao Song" (from Kurt Weill: Die musik zum film)
- 2005 – "The Fight" (from Sound of ?!?!?!?)
- 2006 – "Little Yellow" (from Jukebox Buddha)
- 2013 – "Grand Hotel Tbilisi" (from Songs of Decadence: A Soundtrack to the Writings of Stanisław Przybyszewski)

== Other recordings ==
=== Band work ===
- Bargeld performed on all Einstürzende Neubauten recordings.
- Bargeld played guitar and sang on all studio recordings for Nick Cave and the Bad Seeds from 1984 to 2003.

=== Session work ===
- 1993 – actor in radio play Radio Inferno
- 1996 – "Die Sonne" (for Gudrun Gut and Members of the Ocean Club single)
- 1998 – vocals on Bad Blood album by Ice
- 2001 – actor in Elementarteilchen (audioplay based on Michel Houellebecq's novel Les Particules élémentaires)
- 2009 – guitars on Novice LP by Alain Bashung
- 2015 – Marcher sur la tête by KiKu feat. Blixa Bargeld & Black Cracker, composed by Yannick Barman (Everest Records)
- 2017 – Eng, Düster und Bang by KiKu feat. Blixa Bargeld & Black Cracker, composed by Yannick Barman yannickbarman.com(everest records) kikusound.com everestrecords.ch
- 2021 – Bright Magic by Public Service Broadcasting feat. Blixa Bargeld on the track Der Rhythmus der Maschinen

=== Readings ===
- 2006 – Blixa Bargeld liest Bertolt Brecht Erotische Gedichte (spoken voice recording in German of Bertolt Brecht's erotic poems)

== Compositions ==
- 1996 – To Have and to Hold (with Nick Cave & Mick Harvey)
- 2000 – Recycled (composed by Blixa Bargeld, arranged by Tim Isfort and performed by his orchestra)
- 2001 – Elementarteilchen (score)

== Filmography ==
- Bad Blood for the Vampyr
- Recycled (2000)
- Die totale Therapie
- Die Terroristen!
- Wings of Desire (as himself, during the Nick Cave and the Bad Seeds performance)
- Dandy (1988, directed by Peter Sempel)
- Nihil oder Alle Zeit der Welt (as himself, 1988, directed by Uli M Schueppel)
- Strike Back (1981)
- Jahre der Kälte/Frozen Stories (filmmusic, 1993, directed by Uli M Schueppel)
- Liebeslieder (1995)
- Code Red (1997)
- The Mummy (1999) (Mummy sounds)
- Palast der Republik (2004)
- Halber Mensch (2005)
- On Tour with Neubauten.org (2006)
- Listen With Pain (2006)
- Blixa Bargeld: Rede / Speech DVD (2006)
- Elektrokohle – von wegen (as himself, filmmusic, (1994, directed by Uli M Schueppel)
- Hornbach commercials (German hardware store) reading tool catalogs as spoken word
- 20,000 Days on Earth (2014)
- B-Movie: Lust & Sound in West-Berlin
- Swans: Where Does a Body End? (as himself, 2020, directed by Marco Porsia)
