= The Dangling Man =

EP by Crime & the City Solution
- Released: 1985
- Recorded: February 1985
- Studio: Music Works, London
- Genre: Post-punk, punk blues
- Length: 18:43
- Label: Mute

Crime & the City Solution chronology
The Dangling Man (1985)	Just South of Heaven (1985)

The Dangling Man is an EP by Crime & the City Solution, released in 1985 through Mute Records.

== Reception ==
Spin wrote, "One of the darkest slabs of black vinyl dispensed without a prescription. Simon Bonney tackles vocal chores, working a slurry, low-voiced grumble in which son of Cave meets Jim Morrison."

== Track listing ==
All lyrics are written by Bronwyn Bonney and Simon Bonney

Side one
No.	Title	Music	Length
1.	"The Dangling Man"	Mick Harvey	4:02
2.	"The Last Day"	Harry Howard	5:24

Side two
No.	Title	Music	Length
1.	"At the Crossroads"	Rowland S. Howard	5:44
2.	"Shakin' Chill"	Mick Harvey	3:33

== Personnel ==
Crime & the City Solution

- Simon Bonney – vocals
- Mick Harvey – drums, keyboards, cello, illustrations
- Harry Howard – bass guitar
- Rowland S. Howard – guitar

Production and additional personnel

- Bleddyn Butcher – photography
- Flood – engineering
- Jutta Henglein – photography

== Charts ==
Chart (1985)	Peak position
UK Indie Chart	17
