= Just South of Heaven =

EP by Crime & the City Solution
- Released: 1985
- Recorded: July 1985
- Studio: Strongroom, London
- Genre: Post-punk, punk blues
- Length: 28:20
- Label: Mute

Crime & the City Solution chronology
The Dangling Man (1985)	Just South of Heaven (1985)	Room of Lights (1986)

Professional ratings
Review scores
Source	Rating
Allmusic	4.5/5 stars
NME	favorable
Trouser Press	very favorable

Just South of Heaven is an EP by Crime & the City Solution, released in 1985 through Mute Records.

== Reception ==
The EP received favorable reviews upon release. Mat Snow, writing for NME, noted similarities of the band's sound to that of The Birthday Party and compared Bonney's vocals to "Tom Waits throwing up into a fried-egg sandwich." He writes however, that "Harvey, Soundtracks and the Howard brothers are developing into something equally commanding [to that of The Birthday Party's music] [...] should Simon Bonney ever outgrow this fetishism, then Crime and the City Solution will achieve the truly distinct greatness promised by this record. They're just a kiss away from the pearly gates." Writing for Trouser Press, David Sheridan called the album "cleaner and more powerful [than The Dangling Man EP]: all six tracks work well. Howard's guitar is as strong as ever, but piano and organ figure just as prominently. A hauntingly beautiful record by a well-integrated band."

Allmusic went on to pick the EP as the highlight of the band's discography, with Robert Gordon writing: "Aussies with a gothic vision of the American South."

== Track listing ==
Side one
No.	Title	Lyrics	Music	Length
1.	"Rose Blue"	Bronwyn Adams, Simon Bonney	Epic Soundtracks	4:50
2.	"The Coal Train"	Simon Bonney	Mick Harvey	5:55
3.	"Stolen & Stealing"	Bronwyn Adams	Epic Soundtracks	3:20

Side two
No.	Title	Lyrics	Music	Length
1.	"Five Stone Walls"	Simon Bonney	Mick Harvey	4:15
2.	"Trouble Come This Morning"	Bronwyn Adams, Simon Bonney	Rowland S. Howard	4:30
3.	"The Wailing Wall"	Bronwyn Adams, Simon Bonney	Rowland S. Howard	5:30

== Personnel ==
Crime & the City Solution

- Simon Bonney – vocals
- Mick Harvey – electric guitar (track 1), organ (tracks 1, 4), piano (tracks 2, 4), acoustic guitar (tracks 2, 3, 5), slide guitar (track 6)
- Rowland S. Howard – electric guitar (tracks 2, 4–6), slide guitar (track 2), feedback (track 3), piano (track 1, 5), organ (track 6), saxophone (track 6)
- Harry Howard – bass (tracks 1, 2, 4–6), acoustic guitar (track 3)
- Epic Soundtracks – drums (tracks 1–5), piano (track 3), organ (track 3), bell (track 4), brush drums (track 6)

Production and additional personnel

- Bronwyn Adams – painting
- Flood – engineering

== Charts ==
Chart (1985)	Peak position
UK Indie Chart	3
