= A History of Crime – Berlin 1987–1991: An Introduction to Crime & the City Solution =

A History of Crime - Berlin 1987-1991: An Introduction to Crime & the City Solution

Compilation album by Crime & the City Solution
- Released: September 24, 2012
- Recorded: 1987 – 1996
- Genre: Post-punk
- Length: 71:27
- Label: Mute
- Producer: Chrislo Haas

Crime & the City Solution chronology
Paradise Discotheque (1990)	A History of Crime - Berlin 1987-1991: An Introduction to Crime & the City Solution (2012)	American Twilight (2013)

Professional ratings
Review scores
Source	Rating
Allmusic	4.5/5 stars

A History of Crime – Berlin 1987-1991: An Introduction to Crime & the City Solution is a compilation album by Crime & the City Solution, released on September 24, 2012 through Mute Records.

== Reception ==
In The Sunday Times, Stewart Lee said, "Here's the final incarnation of Bonney's band, decamped to a Berlin in flux, with art house German accomplices, playing wide-screen world-music post-punk cabaret-blues over growled apocalyptic visions of displaced people in transit and dictatorial nation states in collapse."

== Track listing ==
All tracks are written by Crime & the City Solution.

No.	Title	Original album (date)	Length
1.	"All Must Be Love"	Shine (1988)	5:20
2.	"Hunter"	Shine (1988)	4:49
3.	"On Every Train (Grain Will Bear Grain)"	Shine (1988)	3:59
4.	"Home Is Far from Here"	Shine (1988)	3:23
5.	"Keepsake"	The Bride Ship (1989)	4:40
6.	"The Bride Ship"	The Bride Ship (1989)	6:23
7.	"Free World"	The Bride Ship (1989)	3:13
8.	"New World"	The Bride Ship (1989)	3:28
9.	"I Have the Gun"	Paradise Discotheque (1990)	3:34
10.	"The Dolphins and the Sharks"	Paradise Discotheque (1990)	4:43
11.	"The Sun Before the Darkness"	Paradise Discotheque (1990)	5:15
12.	"The Last Dictator I"	Paradise Discotheque (1990)	4:41
13.	"The Last Dictator II"	Paradise Discotheque (1990)	5:02
14.	"The Last Dictator III"	Paradise Discotheque (1990)	4:46
15.	"The Last Dictator IV"	Paradise Discotheque (1990)	2:36
16.	"The Adversary"	Adversary: Live (1996)	5:35
