= Olga Volchkova =

Russian-born artist (born c. 1970)

- Born: 1970 (age 55–56); Tver, Russia
- Occupation: Artist
- Website: olgalaxy.com

Olga Volchkova (Russian: Ольга Волчкова; born 1970) is a Russian-born artist currently resident in Eugene, Oregon.

== Biography ==
Volchkova was born in Tver, Russia, in 1970, in the former Soviet Union. Many of her relatives were collectivized subsistence farmers living in villages outside of the city, and across the seasons she would leave the city to farm, garden, and forage for berries and mushrooms with them. She developed a sympathy with nature that would influence her later art. As a child she went to math school, and studied piano for eight years in music school.

As an adult in Tver she studied chemistry and art, taking degrees in art restoration and Icon painting. The Grabar Institute certified her as a second-degree Oil Painting restorer. She worked as a conservator and curator in the Tver Oblast Art Gallery, and joined a journeyman team of important early post-Soviet iconostasis painters and restorers. Since she played a role in the Icon revival, her secular work could be considered a branch of that tradition.

In 1998, she moved to the United States, where she worked as an all-around art restorer in Manhattan. In 1999, she moved to downtown Palo Alto, California, where she found herself in the heart of the first Dotcom boom. She became artistic director for Workspot, a now defunct start-up and contracting house near University Avenue in Palo Alto. There she pioneered the commercial use of scanned watercolors in webpage design, a laborious approach that won her no imitators, but many admirers—Workspot took the 2000 Linux Journal award for Best Web Solution.

In 2000 she moved to Eugene, Oregon. She studied ceramics and figure sculpture at the University of Oregon, and her work became a small sensation in Eugene's wood-fired ceramics movement. She became involved in concluding work in a research project initiated by architect Christopher Alexander. In 2002 she began to study at the world-renowned Pilchuck Glass School, where she discovered cast glass. One of her first pieces was selected as the only cast glass work for Pilchuck's live auction, Passion Afire, of emerging glass artists, held at the Experience Music Project in Seattle. Within a year, Pilchuck also selected her work for their annual live auction, in the company of some of the world's most famous glass artists.

In 2003, she co-founded a non-profit dance institute, The Tango Center, and became its art director. She managed the hall's interior design and construction, but also sang Russian Tangos with the house band, and improvised Argentine Tango, the dance, with various partners in front of live audiences.

In 2005 Volchkova left the US to adjust her immigration status. In the atmosphere of the Bush administration, the adjustment was repeatedly delayed and denied, making for a total of five years in exile. She spent time painting in India, where she became inspired by colors that contrasted with the grey landscape of Moscow. In 2010, on her eighth try, she was granted residency, and returned to Oregon. On her return, she worked as a gardener, reuniting her with her lifelong love of plants, and inspiring her botanical artwork. She again became involved in community projects.

In 2013 she appeared on the cover of Crime & the City Solution's album American Twilight. She also played the central figure in music videos released by Mute Records for the album, created by Danielle de Picciotto.

Her latest major series of paintings, original icons known as the 'Garden Saints', were part of two Art exhibitions in Berlin, and two in Hamburg, in 2012 and 2013. These are based on her experience as a gardener, landscape designer, and farmer, and inspired by research on the history of human-plant interaction.

The icon series includes over a hundred plant canonizations, nineteen of which were exhibited from 2015 to 2016 at the University of Oregon's Jordan Schnitzer Museum of Art. In 2016, the "Rose and Chocolate" Icon from this series became the album cover of "Unity" from the Potomak label of Einstürzende Neubauten.

Art publisher Pomegranate released notecards of the Garden Saints, and a calendar in 2018. Volchkova occasionally teaches Icon painting at the University of Oregon's Jordan Schnitzer Museum of Art, and she is the topic of research projects.

A public television segment on her work was nominated for a 2016 Emmy award.

In 2022 she exhibited at the Schneider Museum of Art at Southern Oregon University.

In 2023 two of her icons were included in a history of art and plants, published in four languages by Taschen books, entitled 'Plant Magick'.

In 2023-24 she has a solo exhibition at The Museum of Russian Art in Minneapolis.
