= Room of Lights =

Studio album by Crime & the City Solution
- Released: October 27, 1986
- Recorded: March–September 1986
- Studio: Hansa Tonstudios, Berlin and The Strongroom, London.
- Genre: Post-punk, punk blues
- Length: 34:03
- Label: Mute
- Producer: Tony Cohen, Flood

Crime & the City Solution chronology
Just South of Heaven (1985)	Room of Lights (1986)	Shine (1988)

Professional ratings
Review scores
Source	Rating
Allmusic	4.5/5 stars
Trouser Press	mixed
Forced Exposure	favorable

Room of Lights is the debut studio album by Crime & the City Solution, released on October 27, 1986 through Mute Records.

== Reception ==
The album received positive reviews upon release, much like the EPs that preceded it. Byron Coley wrote that the album "touches a dim, forgotten nerve-root lurking deep in the bowel of a mud-wad giant. The pace and instrumentation both seem poured from a jug of arsenic-laced dog-honey and Simon's voice and lyrics strip nude a whole new patch of soul-turf [...] I've heard that there're people who don't like this, but I don't believe it. I can believe people not liking the Doors, but [...]" David Sheridan found the album to feature "a noticeably heavier and thicker sound. With the predominance of slow tempos, Bonney's somewhat unattractive voice and the overly serious lyrics, supplied mostly by violinist Bronwyn Adams, the disc is laboriously endurance-defying. The band seems to be somewhat stunted developmentally; these eight songs are merely variations on previously introduced themes."

"Following on the heels of two successful EPs," writes Amy Hanson, "Crime & the City Solution turned around to record some of their best material for Room of Lights. With violinist Bronwyn Adams added to the camp, the band acted as dynamically jagged counterparts to their peers; the music they now embraced was a rough and ready rock that slotted itself nicely under a gothic canvas – they were and remain post-punk's forgotten kings."

== In popular culture ==
The band was shown performing the song "Six Bells Chime" on Wim Wenders' 1987 film Wings of Desire.

== Track listing ==
Side one
No.	Title	Lyrics	Music	Length
1.	"Right Man, Wrong Man"	Bronwyn Adams, Simon Bonney	Mick Harvey	4:20
2.	"No Money, No Honey"	Bronwyn Adams	Mick Harvey	3:50
3.	"Hey Sinkiller"	Bronwyn Adams	Mick Harvey	4:08
4.	"Six Bells Chime"	Bronwyn Adams, Simon Bonney	Rowland S. Howard	5:40

Side two
No.	Title	Lyrics	Music	Length
1.	"Adventure"	Simon Bonney	Epic Soundtracks, Harry Howard	3:25
2.	"Untouchable"	Bronwyn Adams, Simon Bonney	Epic Soundtracks, Mick Harvey, Harry Howard, Rowland S. Howard	5:15
3.	"The Brother Song"	Bronwyn Adams	Mick Harvey	3:35
4.	"Her Room of Lights"	Simon Bonney	Rowland S. Howard	3:50

== Personnel ==
Crime & the City Solution

- Simon Bonney – vocals
- Epic Soundtracks – drums, piano on "No Money, No Honey" and "Hey Sinkiller"
- Mick Harvey – piano, guitar, organ on "Right Man, Wrong Man", Tom-toms on "Her Room of Lights"
- Harry Howard – bass guitar
- Rowland S. Howard – guitar, organ on "Hey Sinkiller" and "Adventure", piano on "Untouchable"

Production and additional personnel

- Bronwyn Adams – illustrations, violin on "The Brother Song"
- Emily Andersen – photography
- Sven Borman – assistant engineering
- Tony Cohen – production, engineering
- Flood – production, engineering, photography
- Peter Gruchot – photography
- Peter Milne – photography
- Rowland S. Howard*scarped

== Charts ==
Chart (1986)	Peak position
UK Indie Chart	14
