= Teenage Snuff Film =

Studio album by Rowland S. Howard
- Released: 1999
- Studio: Birdland Studios, Prahran; Sing Sing Recording Studios, Cremorne
- Genre: Post-punk; punk blues
- Length: 54:20
- Label: Reliant Records
- Producer: Lindsay Gravina

Rowland S. Howard chronology
Teenage Snuff Film (1999)	Pop Crimes (2009)

Professional ratings
Review scores
Source	Rating
AllMusic	4/5 stars

Teenage Snuff Film is the debut solo studio album by Rowland S. Howard, released in 1999. The album was produced by Lindsay Gravina and features Howard's former The Birthday Party bandmate Mick Harvey on drums, organ and guitar, with Brian Hooper of The Beasts of Bourbon on bass guitar. It contains eight original songs, and two cover versions: "White Wedding" by Billy Idol, and "She Cried" (previously performed by The Shangri-Las, Johnny Thunders, and others).

Teenage Snuff Film was produced, mixed and mastered at Birdland Studios in Prahran and Sing Sing Recording Studios in Cremorne. Although not a commercial success upon release, the album would go on to attract a cult following.

The album was reissued as a limited edition double LP in October 2011, with minor track listing changes. Remastered versions of both Howard's solo albums were released by Mute Records in Europe, Fat Possum in America and Bloodlines in Australia on 27 March 2020.

== Background and reception ==
Howard began work on the album following the disbandment of his band These Immortal Souls in 1998. In an effort to keep the recording process minimal, he recruited few musicians to play on the album, including multi-instrumentalist and former The Birthday Party bandmate Mick Harvey, and bassist Brian Hooper of The Beasts of Bourbon.

Teenage Snuff Film was well-received by critics upon release in 1999, with the sound described as "a long, roiling howl of pain, wrought from the place where rock & roll loss and grief meet blues textures and near-gothic soundscapes."

== Legacy ==
Teenage Snuff Film was met with little fanfare during its initial release, but went on to reach cult status and become an influential post-punk release. Against Me! lead singer Laura Jane Grace named Teenage Snuff Film her favourite album of all time, while Jehnny Beth of Savages and Faris Badwan of The Horrors consider Howard and his work on the album a major influence.

== Track listing ==
All tracks are written by Rowland S. Howard, except where noted.

No.	Title	Writer(s)	Length
1.	"Dead Radio"		5:39
2.	"Breakdown (And Then...)"		6:25
3.	"She Cried"	Greg Richards, Ted Daryll	4:58
4.	"I Burnt Your Clothes"		4:13
5.	"Exit Everything"	Howard, Brian Hooper	7:34
6.	"Silver Chain"	Genevieve McGuckin, Howard	4:37
7.	"White Wedding"	Billy Idol	2:54
8.	"Undone"		6:55
9.	"Autoluminescent"		3:26
10.	"Sleep Alone"	Howard, Hooper	7:39
Total length:			54:20

Limited edition vinyl reissue bonus track
No.	Title	Writer(s)	Length
11.	"Ocean" (Rowland S. Howard Vs The Devastations)	Lou Reed	3:51

Vinyl version
No.	Title	Writer(s)	Length
1.	"Dead Radio"		5:39
2.	"Breakdown (And Then...)"		6:25
3.	"She Cried"	Greg Richards, Ted Daryll	4:58
4.	"I Burnt Your Clothes"		4:13
5.	"Exit Everything"	Howard, Brian Hooper	7:34
6.	"Silver Chain"	Genevieve McGuckin, Howard	4:37
7.	"White Wedding"	Billy Idol	2:54
8.	"Undone"		6:55
9.	"Autoluminescent"		3:26
10.	"Shut Me Down"		3:40
11.	"Sleep Alone"	Howard, Hooper	7:39
Total length:			58:00

== Personnel ==
- Rowland S. Howard – vocals, guitar
- Mick Harvey – drums, organ; rhythm guitar on "Sleep Alone"
- Brian Hooper – bass guitar

with:

- Genevieve McGuckin – organ on "Silver Chain"
- Steve Boyle – drums on "Autoluminescent"
- Andrew Entsch, Jen Anderson, Robin Casinader – strings

Technical

- Lindsay Gravina – producer, session engineer, mixing engineer, mastering engineer
- James Masson – assistant engineer
- Jade Martin – assistant engineer
- Rowland S. Howard, Genevieve McGuckin – cover

== Charts ==
Chart performance of Teenage Snuff Film
Chart (2020)	Peak position
Australian Albums (ARIA)	74
