= Florence De Jong =

English theatre and cinema organist (1894–1990)

- Born: 1894; Holborn, London, England
- Died: 1990 (aged 95–96)
- Occupation: Theatre/cinema organist
- Years active: 1920s–1970s
- Relatives: Ena Baga (sister)

Florence De Jong (née Baga; 1894–1990) was an English theatre and cinema organist.

De Jong was born in Holborn, London, and learned piano at school. She had three sisters, all professional musicians, as was their father. Her youngest sister, Ena Baga, was also an organist, billed as "Queen of the Keyboard". As well as cinemas, she also played on cruise liners.

She appeared as a castaway on the BBC Radio programme Desert Island Discs on 7 April 1973.

Olivier Award winner Martyn Jacques, of the band The Tiger Lillies, was her pupil, and has dedicated a performance to her memory.
