= Genevieve McGuckin =

- Born: Brisbane, Queensland, Australia
- Genres: Post-punk
- Occupations: Musician; producer; graphic design
- Instruments: Piano; organ; keyboards; harmonium
- Years active: 1980–present

Genevieve McGuckin is an Australian musician, songwriter, film producer and graphic designer who was born in Brisbane. In 1986 she was a founder of These Immortal Souls on keyboards and has collaborated with fellow founder, and sometime domestic partner, Rowland S. Howard, and with his earlier band, the Birthday Party, on their album, Prayers on Fire (April 1981).

== Biography ==
Genevieve McGuckin was born in Brisbane. She has been a long-time collaborator (both musically and romantically speaking, at various points) of rock musician, Rowland S. Howard. During 1980, in London, the pair co-wrote two tracks, "Capers" and "Ho-Ho", for his band, the Birthday Party's debut LP Prayers on Fire (April 1981).

In 1982 McGuckin provided piano and organ on Howard and Lydia Lunch's cover version of Lee Hazlewood and Nancy Sinatra's "Some Velvet Morning" (1967), which later appeared on Lunch's album, Honeymoon in Red (1987). She also wrote the track, "Three Kings", for the album.

In 1984 both McGuckin, on keyboards, piano and organ, and Howard on guitar were founding members of a post-punk group, These Immortal Souls. Other founders were Rowland's brother, Harry on bass guitar and Epic Soundtracks (a.k.a. Kevin Godfrey) on drums. They issued two albums, Get Lost (Don't Lie) in October 1987 and I'm Never Gonna Die Again in October 1992, before relocating to Melbourne in 1994. While in the group she also wrote music and lyrics on both their albums and a single.

She also played organ on, and wrote the music for, the song "Silver Chain" on Howard's solo album Teenage Snuff Film. She lived in London and Berlin from 1980 to 1994 and now lives in Melbourne, working in film graphics, web design, and animation. She was the graphic designer on the 2000 film Chopper.

Recently, she has been playing piano and organ in Luxedo and Vera Cruz. She has also played on an LP by The Devastations.

== Discography ==
=== Albums ===
Year	Title
1987	Honeymoon in Red
1987	These Immortal Souls - Get Lost (Don't Lie)
1992	These Immortal Souls - I'm Never Gonna Die Again
1995	You Can't Unring a Bell - The Songs of Tom Waits

== Filmography ==
=== Films ===
Year	Title
2000	Chopper (Graphic Design)
2011	Autoluminescent (Producer/Contributor)
