= The Mountains of Madness =

Audiovisual musical adaptation of the works of H. P. Lovecraft

The Mountains of Madness is an audiovisual musical adaptation of the works of H. P. Lovecraft by Tiger Lillies, Danielle de Picciotto and Alexander Hacke. It was conceived by Hacke in 2005. Tiger Lillies performs the music with narration by Hacke from selections of Lovecraft's stories.

== The Performance ==
The performance lasts a little more than an hour. An opening monologue blends the opening of Lovecraft's never-completed "Azathoth" with excerpts from a biography. Between a number of the songs, Hacke narrates from other short works by Lovecraft. The music is underscored by soundscapes created and performed by Alexander Hacke and illustrations by Danielle de Picciotto. The lyrics reflect themes of sorrow and despair.

The songs:

1. "Intro"
2. "The Mountaintops"
3. "Rats (In The Walls)"
4. "The Cult of Cthulhu"
5. "The Butcher"
6. "The Music of Erich Zann"
7. "Subconscious Mind"
8. "Charles Dexter Ward"
9. "Do You Know What's Wrong?"
10. "Haunter of the Dark"
11. "Mountains Of Madness"
12. "Paranoid"
13. "The Butcher (Revisited)"

=== Credits ===
- Accordion/Vocal - Martyn Jacques
- Drums - Adrian Huge
- Bass/Saw - Adrian Stout
- Electronic Soundscapes/Narration - Alexander Hackes
- Illustrations - Danielle de Picciotto

== Home media ==
The music has not been released on CD, but a DVD featuring the complete premier performance is available. In 2020, the band made the music available as a digital release.

== Musical ==
Necronomicon
- Music: Tiger Lillies; Eric Enocksson (arrangement); Sven Hugo Persson (translation)
- Book: Gustav Tegby
- Basis: Mountains of Madness by Tiger Lillies, Alexander Hacke & Danielle de Picciotto and the stories of H.P. Lovecraft
- Productions: 2013 Stockholm

In 2013 the performance was adapted into Necronomicon, a musical for the Royal Dramatic Theatre in Stockholm, Sweden. The music was rearranged for electronic music and used as the backbone for a storyline. The musical's storyline is a mix of The Music of Erich Zann, The Rats in the Walls, The Call of Cthulhu, At the Mountains of Madness, The Shadow Out of Time and The Thing on the Doorstep The musical follows the young composer Edward Jr. is tasked with showing the archeologist Judith and her daughter Edith the newly opened mine that is owned by Edward's father. But soon they find themselves trapped in the cavern and they are not alone. They find most of the workers dead and are tormented by the insane worker Sebastian.

=== Plot ===
The audience is led into a dormitory in a mental ward. Edward Zann Jr. is sitting on a bed with bloody hands and a knife. Caretakers wearing masks appear and restrain him after he has hummed a strange melody. The Head Psychologist appears above the audience and follows the melody (The Music Of Erich Zann). The Head Psychologist invite the audience into the auditorium. The audience is led onto a stand. The Psychologists ask Edward Jr to tell them about what happened in the mine of Svartvatten (Black Water).

Edward Jr. explains that his father Edward Zann owned a mine in his home town Svartvatten. During digging the workers found "strange geology" in the mine and Judith Grip, an old friend of Edward was sent after. Edward Jr, an aspiring composer, was supposed to meet up with them and lead them into the mine to meet up with Edward. Along with Judith came Edith, Edward Jr's childhood friend. Judith gives Edith the family pendant as she now is an adult. Edward Jr explains that his compositions came from dreams and strange melodies that came to him seemingly from nowhere. As the trio arrives in Svartvatten Edward is nowhere to be found and they decide to go look for him in the mine (The Mountains of Madness). The mine is seemingly abandoned and soon the elevator and one way out malfunctions, trapping them. The group discover unnatural stalagmites that have perfect surfaces like they were sculpted. One of them opens and a pulp of flesh drips out. They quickly realise that this is the remains of the workers. As they try to turn on the elevator the electricity goes out and the stage goes dark. Edward Jr runs alone in the darkness with only a small headlamp to light his way (and the stage). Suddenly a blonde, crazed and hulking worker appears and terrorizes Edward Jr with an insane rant about rats (The Rats in the Wall). As the light returns Edward recognises the worker as Sebastian. Sebastian is covered in blood and seemingly delighted by the chaos and horror. He rants about the Necronomicon. Edward Jr, Judith and Edith manage to subdue him and tie him up. They accuse him of killing the worker to which he neither denies or admits. When Edward Jr mentions the music Sebastian reveals he can hear it to and finds it beautiful. Sebastian says he found the Necronomicon in the mine and when he read is he learned the truth about everything and the Old Gods. He directs Edith to the book and she becomes enticed by it. When reading it she realises that the killing of the workers is part of a ritual to awaken the Old Gods and that they will destroy mankind when awakened (The Cult of Cthulhu).

As the group goes to sleep, Edward Jr remembers the serial killer, the Butcher, who haunted Svartvatten during their childhood (The Butcher). Sebastian frees himself but Edward appears with a gun too shot him. Sebastian flees but steals the Necronomicon. When Edward hears that Sebastian has found the lost Necronomicon which was the property of the Zanns for centuries he agrees that Sebastian is trying to awaken the Old Gods. Edward Jr goes away by himself and whispers to himself (Paranoid). Sebastian reads from the Necronomicon and throws himself onto a stalagmite which kills him. The whole mine shakes and eldritch symbols appear on the floor. Edith sinks into despair thinking Sebastian has succeeded with his plan (Haunter of the Dark).

Edward Jr remembers a midsummer when he was a child (Subconscious Mind). Edward and Judith had discovered minerals in the local mountains allowing a mine to be opened. But soon after Judith's mother is found murdered by the Butcher. In the mine, Edith finds out that the ritual can be reversed by performing it again. Judith kills Edward to be the sacrifice and forces Edith to read from the Necronomicon. Sebastian suddenly awakens from the dead and attacks the group trying to prevent them from performing the ritual but they manage to kill him again. Edith reads from the book but group notices something is wrong. Suddenly Edith feels pain and falls to the ground. Her pendant is glowing and Judith reveals that she is in fact the consciousness of the Grips ancestral mother who through the pendant has passed on for centuries trying to awaken the Old Gods. Edward Jr stabs Judith but this is in fact how the transmission is concluded: he has killed Edith who is trapped in Judith's body. Sebastian actually tried to stop the awakening but was to insane after learning the truth that he could not tell. Judith burns the Necronomicon preventing the awakening from being stopped but Edward Jr stabs her to death thus robbing her of her prize: seeing and meeting the Gods.

The stand is pulled back and the action returns to the hospital. Edward Jr sums up his story. The psychologists start to question his story, but not the fantastical elements. Instead they ask him how he could escape the mine and how he could be at the hospital if the Old Gods were unleashed? In a chilling twist the entire front story is revealed to be the actual delusion: Edward Jr. is still in the cave and the hospital scenario is a defense mechanism. As Edward wallows in his despair in the mine, above the Old Gods destroys all other life on the planet (Do You Know What's Wrong?).

=== Cast ===
- Eric Stern — Edward Zann Jr
- Staffan Göthe — Edward Zann/Head Psychologist
- Thérèse Brunnander — Judith Grip/Psychologist
- Maia Hansson Bergqvist — Edith Grip/Psychologist
- David Book — Sebastian/Psychologist
