= These Immortal Souls =

Australian post-punk band

- Origin: London, England
- Genres: Post-punk
- Years active: 1987–1998
- Labels: Mute, SST, Elektra
- Spinoff of: Crime & the City Solution
- Past members: Harry Howard; Rowland S. Howard; Epic Soundtracks; Genevieve McGuckin; Craig Williamson; Spencer P. Jones

These Immortal Souls were an Australian post-punk band formed in London in 1987 by Harry Howard on bass guitar, his older brother Rowland S. Howard on guitar and vocals, Epic Soundtracks (a.k.a. Kevin Godfrey) on drums (all three ex-Crime & the City Solution) and Genevieve McGuckin on keyboards (Rowland's long time girlfriend). They issued two albums on Mute Records, Get Lost (Don't Lie) 1987 and I'm Never Gonna Die Again 1992. The group relocated to Australia in 1995 and played less frequently before disbanding there in mid-1998. Soundtracks died in November 1997 and Rowland S. Howard died in December 2009.

== History ==
Australian brothers Harry on bass guitar and Rowland S. Howard on guitar, and United Kingdom-born drummer Epic Soundtracks (a.k.a. Kevin Godfrey) had been members of the group Crime & the City Solution. However, the Howards and Soundtracks were effectively kicked out of the group when not invited to participate in recording sessions of the 1986 album Shine. As they had already been rehearsing and recording with Genevieve McGuckin for what was seen at the time as a solo outlet for Rowland, the side project then became a permanent band. With Rowland's then-girlfriend, Genevieve McGuckin on keyboards, Harry, Rowland (on lead vocals and guitar) and Soundtracks formed another rock band, These Immortal Souls, in London in 1987. Rowland explained why he formed the group, "I had lots of songs I really liked... songs that would never have been done if I hadn't said, 'Right, I'm going to sing them,' because you can't give somebody a set of lyrics and tell them what to sing if you want any kind of sincerity."

The group's debut single, "Marry Me (Lie! Lie!)", was issued in September 1987. Melody Maker's reviewer asked "What possesses Rowland Howard when he writes an immaculate piece of music, something that might have qualified as the score for Romero's next film?... what spirit galvanizes this frail young man to bugger it all up by singing?" and then answered "It's arrogance. Punishable arrogance... in [his] black hole of insensitivity, [he goes] on to ruin the hard work of others." A 12" extended play version, Marry Me, with three tracks was reviewed by AllMusic's Dean McFarlane "while the EP is astonishing, it is merely a hint of what was to come the following year... [it]features a rendition of 'Open up and Bleed' which is so devastating as to justify seeking [it] out."

Their first studio album, Get Lost (Don't Lie!), was released in October of that year on Mute Records. The tracks were mostly written by Rowland. Australian musicologist, Ian McFarlane, described their material as "dark, ominous, challenging rock music." The group were described by Charles Spano of AllMusic as taking a "wander through the haze of smoky cabarets and faded photos worn at the edges." He felt the album was "Simultaneously rocking, strangely beautiful, and scary, [it] foreshadowed the sound of bands to come over a decade later."

They followed with tours of Europe (Netherlands, Belgium, Germany, Austria, France, Scandinavia, United Kingdom) and a 35-date tour of the United States and Canada where the album was first non USA product released by SST Records. Back in 1982 Howard, McGuckin and US singer, Lydia Lunch, had recorded an album, Honeymoon in Red, which was released on Lunch's Widowspeak label in 1987. They had originally used Rowland's former bandmates from the Birthday Party: Nick Cave, Mick Harvey and Tracy Pew, as well as Thurston Moore (from Sonic Youth). These Immortal Souls undertook a short tour of Australia in 1988.

In 1991 Rowland and Lunch released an album, Shotgun Wedding, and toured with a live band that included his brother Harry. In 1992 These Immortal Souls issued a single "King of Kalifornia" (also as a 12" EP, King of Kalifornia) and, in October, their second album, I'm Never Gonna Die Again, which was co-produced by the group with John Rivers. By that time Soundtracks was working on his solo music career and had left the group. The final European tours saw Chris Hughes (Once Upon a Time, The Fatal Shore etc.) who had previously worked with the band on an Australian tour take the drum stool. A AllMusic's Nitsuh Abebe declared the album was "a well-handled and incredibly dramatic record that attacks with full rock force, recedes into minimal, haunting constructions, and then blasts back."

The band moved to Melbourne Australia in 1995 where Craig Williamson joined on drums and Spencer P. Jones as second guitarist. This line-up recorded a track, "You Can't Unring a Bell", for a Tom Waits tribute album, Step Right Up in 1994. Other artists on that album are Pete Shelley, Tim Buckley, Violent Femmes and 10,000 Maniacs. Later Jones left the group. They continued to perform sporadically and work on new material until the band's final show at the Greyhound Hotel, St Kilda on 23 July 1998, with Lydia Lunch & Hungry Ghosts as support. Two music videos have been broadcast on ABC TV's rage: "Marry Me (Lie! Lie!)" and "King of Kalifornia".

Kevin Godfrey a.k.a. Epic Soundtracks was found dead in his London apartment on 5 November 1997; his cause of death was not identified, despite an autopsy. Rowland S. Howard died as the result of liver cancer on 30 December 2009.

In 2024 the band's two albums were remastered re-released, along with a new compilation album Extra.

== Discography ==
=== Albums ===
- Get Lost (Don't Lie) (October 1987), Mute - UK Indie no. 21
- I'm Never Gonna Die Again (1992), Mute
- Extra (2024), Mute

=== Extended plays ===
- Marry Me (Lie! Lie!) (1987), Mute - UK Indie no. 22
- King of Kalifornia (1992), Mute
