= The Tiger Lillies =

British macabre musical trio

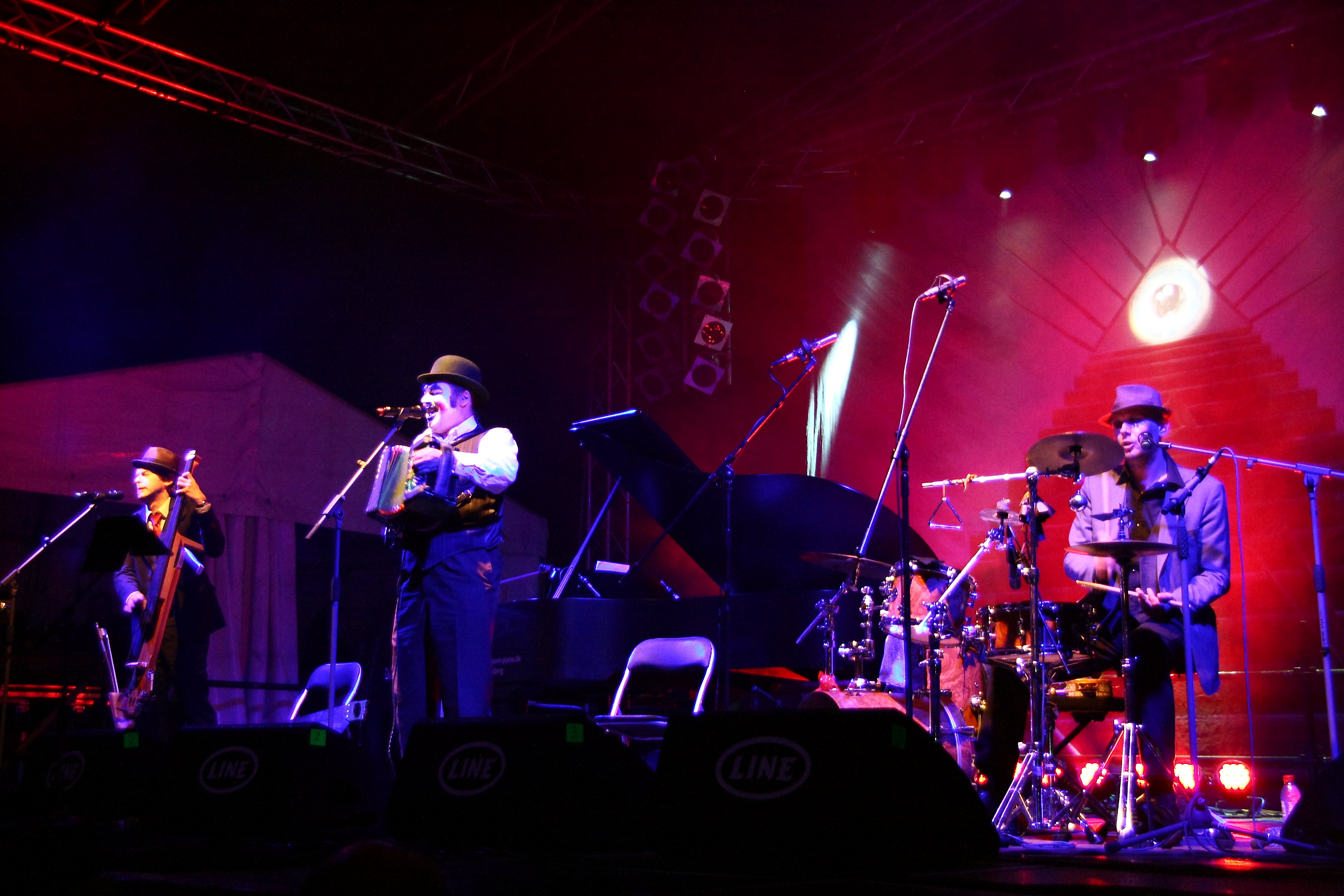
- The Tiger Lillies at TFF Rudolstadt 2013

Background information
- Origin: London
- Genres: Dark cabaret, circus music
- Years active: 1989–present
- Label: Misery Guts Music
- Members: Martyn Jacques; Adrian Stout; Budi Butenop
- Past members: Phil Butcher; Adrian Huge; Mike Pickering; Jonas Golland
- Website: tigerlillies.com

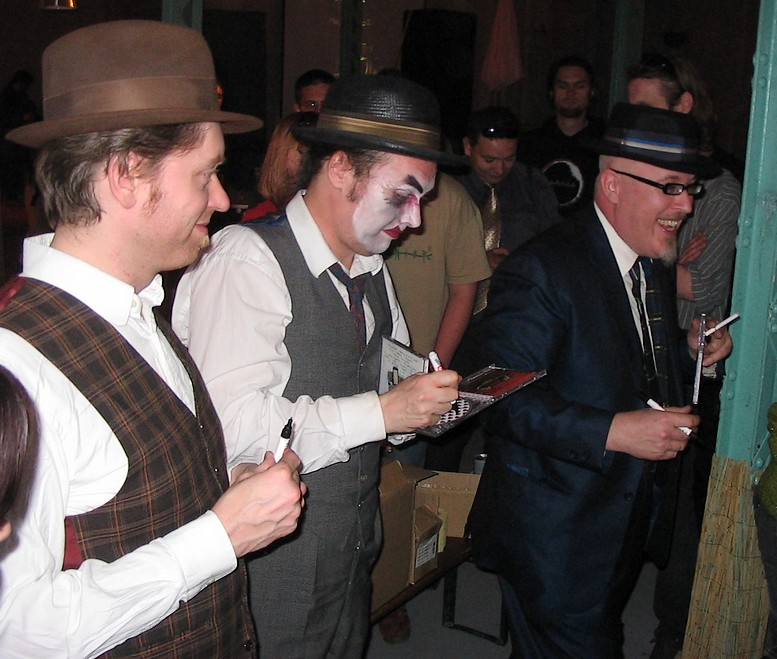
The band after a concert

The Tiger Lillies are a British musical trio formed in 1989 by singer-songwriter Martyn Jacques. Described as the forefathers of Brechtian Punk Cabaret, the Tiger Lillies are known for their unique sound and style which merges "the macabre magic of pre-war Berlin with the savage edge of punk".

== History ==
The band's name is rumoured to have been inspired by a murdered Soho sex worker called Lillie who used to dress up in animal print. Jacques, however, has stated that he named the band after a painting he had on his wall. The band formed in 1989 when Martyn Jacques placed an ad on Loot looking for a drummer and a bass player for a new band. Adrian Huge and Phil Butcher (the band's first bassist who was succeeded by Adrian Stout in 1995) were the only musicians that got in touch with him and therefore became the original Tiger Lillies' drummer and bassist respectively.

In Spring 2012 Adrian Huge decided to take a leave of absence and was replaced by drummer Mike Pickering who toured with the Tiger Lillies from 2012. In early 2015 Pickering was replaced by Jonas Golland. By late 2021 the band had recruited their current drummer, Budi Butenop.

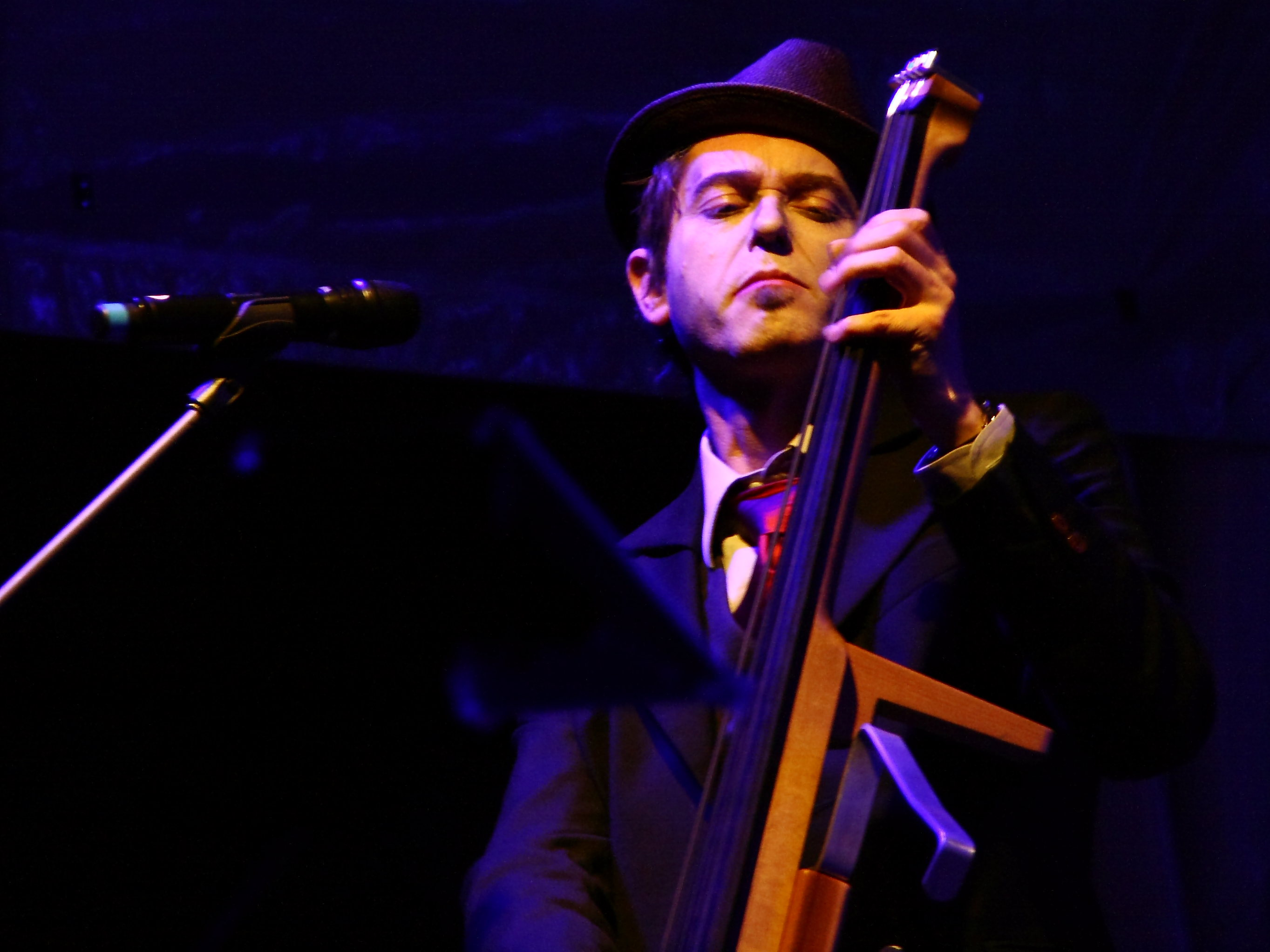
Adrian Stout

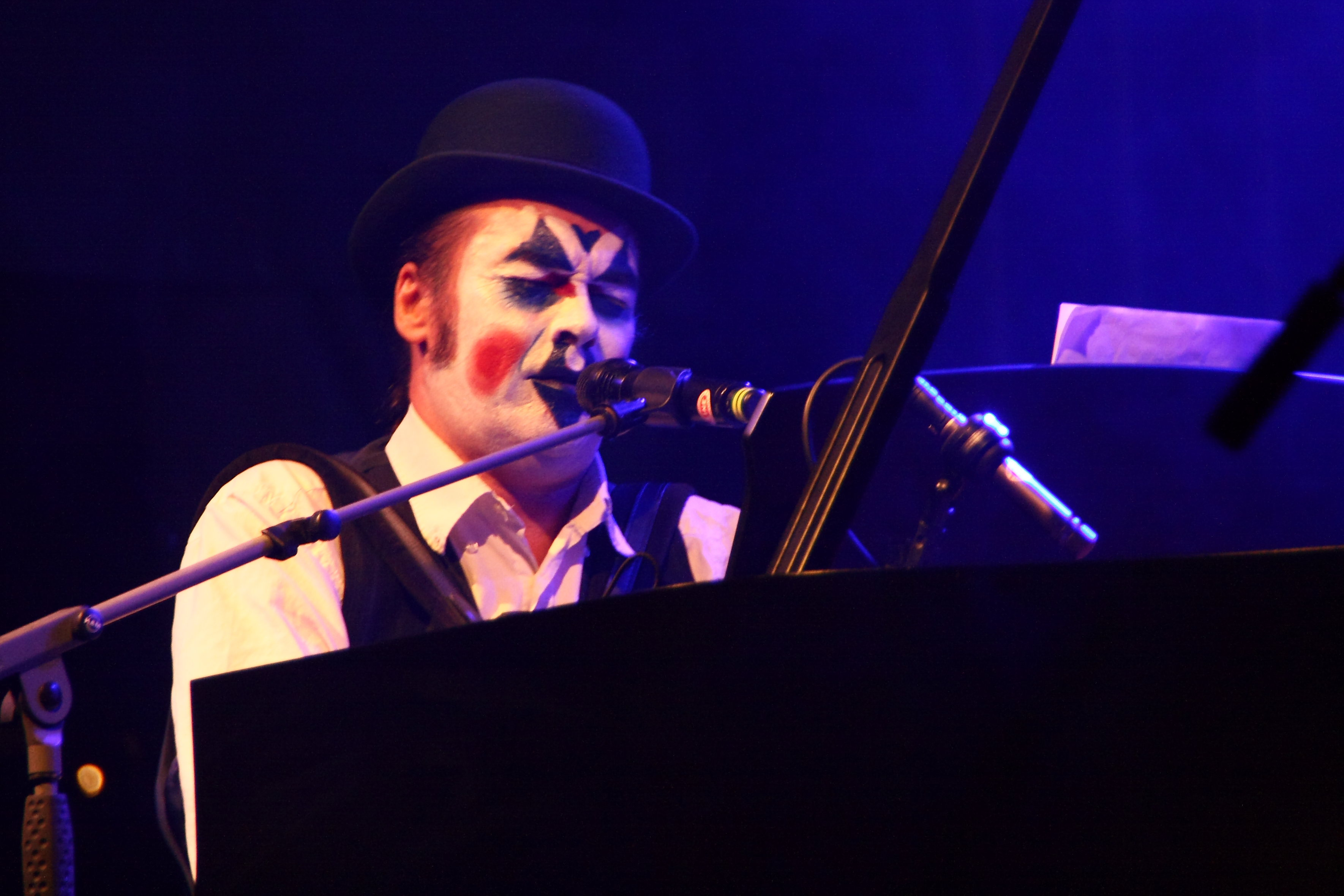
Martyn Jacques

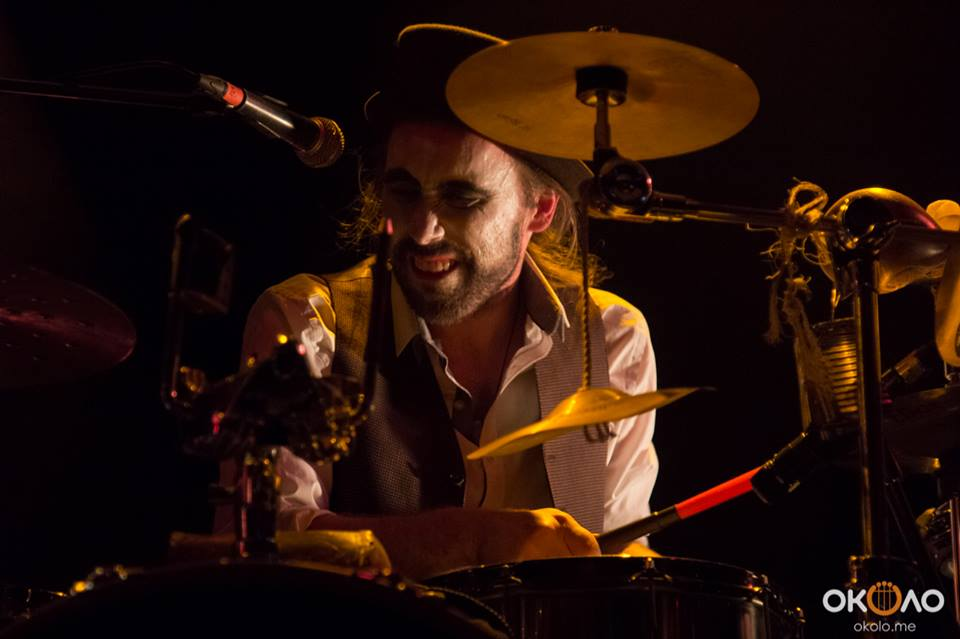
Jonas Golland

== Musical style ==
The Independent has described The Tiger Lillies as "a provocative and avant-garde three-piece band that combines cabaret, vaudeville, music-hall and street theatre", while Tim Arthur of Time Out described them as: "Kurt Weill conjuring up images of prewar Berlin while a falsetto vocalist screams, squeaks and squawks his way through every number like some rambling madman". The Tiger Lillies' songs often involve bestiality, prostitution, blasphemy and other vices. Their musical style is mainly influenced by Bertolt Brecht and Kurt Weill's masterpiece The Threepenny Opera and pre-war Berlin cabaret but other influences such as gypsy and circus music, French chanson and British music hall tunes are also evident.

== Awards and nominations ==
- In 2002 their cult hit musical Shockheaded Peter was nominated for five Olivier Awards. The show won the Olivier for Best Entertainment and Martyn Jacques won the Olivier for Best Supporting Performance in a Musical or Entertainment.
- In 2003 their album The Gorey End (in collaboration with the Kronos Quartet and writer, illustrator Edward Gorey) was nominated for Dominique de Rivaz's Luftbusiness (2008) a Grammy Award for Best Classical Crossover Album.
- In 2012 their show The Tiger Lillies Perform Hamlet, produced by Copenhagen's Republique Theatre and directed by acclaimed Danish director Martin Tulinius, was nominated for a Reumert Award in the category Music Theatre/Show of the Year 2012.
- In 2026 their music video "Stupid Life" was nominated for Best Low Budget at the Berlin Music Video Awards.

== Members ==
Current

- Martyn Jacques – accordion, lead vocals, piano, guitar, harmonica, ukulele, banjolele (1989–present)
- Adrian Stout – double bass, backing vocals, jaw harp, musical saw, theremin (1995–present)
- Budi Butenop – drums, (2021–present)

Past

- Phil Butcher – bass (1989–95)
- Adrian Huge – drums (1989–2012)
- Mike Pickering – drums (2012–15)
- Jonas Golland – drums (2015–21)

== Discography ==
=== Cassettes ===
- Bouquet of Vegetables (1989)
- Spit Bucket (1990)
- Little Death (1991)

=== Studio CDs ===
- Births, Marriages and Deaths (1994)
- Spit Bucket (1995)
- Ad Nauseam (1995)
- The Brothel to the Cemetery (1996)
- Farmyard Filth (1997)
- Low Life Lullabies (1998)
- Shockheaded Peter - A Junk Opera (1998)
- Bad Blood + Blasphemy (1999) (+ vinyl 2015)
- Circus Songs (2000)
- Two Penny Opera (2001)
- The Sea (2002)
- Punch and Judy (2004)
- Death and the Bible (2004)
- Die Weberischen (2006)
- The Little Match Girl (2006)
- Love & War (2007)
- Seven Deadly Sins (2008)
- Freakshow (2009)
- Cockatoo Prison (2010)
- Here I Am Human! (2010)
- Woyzeck (2011)
- Rime of the Ancient Mariner (2012)
- Hamlet (2012)
- Either/Or (2013)
- Lulu – A Murder Ballad (2014)
- A Dream Turns Sour (2014)
- The Story of Franz Biberkopf (2015)
- Madame Piaf (2016)
- Love for Sale - A Hymn to Heroin (2016)
- A Cold Night in Soho (2017) (+ vinyl 2017)
- Edgar Allan Poe's Haunted Palace (2017)
- The Devil's Fairground (2018)
- Corrido De La Sangre (2018)
- COVID-19 (2020, digital only)
- COVID-19, Vol. II (2020, digital only)
- Litany of Satan (2020, digital only)
- Requiem for a Virus (2021, digital only)
- A Christmas Carol (2021)
- Onepenny Opera (2022)
- The Last Days of Mankind (2022)
- Ukraine (2023)
- Lessons in Nihilism (2024)
- Thank You and Good Night (2025)
- Serenade From The Sewer (2025)

=== Soundtracks ===
- Varieté (1925) (New music composed and played by The Tiger Lillies for the E.A. Dupont silent movie) (2015) (DVD)
- Goosebumps (2016) (CD)
- Cravendale advert: Barry the Biscuit Boy (2014)

=== Live CDs ===
- Live in Russia 2000–2001 (2003)
- Live on WFMU (2004)
- Live in Soho (2007)
- Urine Palace (with The Symphony Orchestra of Norrlandsoperan) (2007)
- Live at the New Players Theatre – London 2009 (2009)
- Lemonaki (2020)

=== Compilation CDs ===
- Bouquet of Vegetables - The Early Years (2000)
- The Tiger Lillies (2006)

=== DVDs ===
- Shockheaded Peter and Other Songs – Live in Concert in New York (2000)
- Mountains of Madness (with Alexander Hacke (Einstürzende Neubauten) and drawings by Danielle de Picciotto) (2006)
- The Tiger Lillies – The Early Years (2009)
- The Tiger Lillies Live in Prague (2011)

=== Collaborations CDs ===
- The Gorey End (with The Kronos Quartet) (2003)
- Huinya (with Группировка Ленинград) (2005)
- Sinderella - The Twisted Tale of a Christmas Crack-Whore (with Justin Bond) (2008)
- The Ballad of Sexual Dependency (with Nan Goldin) (2011)
- The Whore of Babylon (with Andréane Leclerc) (2020)

=== Extended play CDs ===
- Goodbye Great Nation (with Contrastate) (1996)
- Special Edition (2000)

=== Contributions / various artists ===
- Misfits (1996, Volume) - "Heroin And Cocaine"
- Torture Garden (1999) "Roll Up"
- Mixx On The Fly - Live From Studio A - WCBE Vol. 7 (2000, WCBE) - "Flying Robert"
- Fly On The Wall: Lost Tracks From Studio A (2001, WCBE) - "Snip Snip (Suck-A-Thumb)"
- Дед Мороз Против Анти Деда Мороза Bad Taste Новый Год (2002) "Drunken Sailor"
- WFMU Gone Wild! (2005, WFMU) - "Banging In The Nails" (Video Compilation)
- Kosmos 93.6FM - Ethnic Collection Vol.3 (2005, Minos EMI) - "Weeping Chandelier"
- Dimitris Papaspyropoulos presents Once Upon a Time (2005, Columbia Records) - "Russians"
- Plague Songs (2006, 4AD) - "Hailstones"
- A Sepiachord Passport (2010, Projekt) - "Roll Up"
- The Devil In Love: A Soundtrack To The 1772 Occult Novel (2011, Malort Forlag) - "I'm In Love With The Devil"
- Un-Herd Volume 62 (2017, R2 Records) - "You Wouldn't Know"

=== Digital release ===
- Mountains of Madness (with Alexander Hacke) (2020)

== Books ==
- 1998 – The Ultimate Shockheaded Peter Book – ISBN 3-932909-99-2
- 2003 – Farmyard Fantasy Book – made by b7UE
- 2007 – "The Tiger Lillies Book" – b7UE 02
- 2007 – "The Tiger Lillies – Selected illustrations of songs" – by Anne Sophie Malmberg
- 2008 – "The Inquisitorial Skeleton Shooting" – limited edition shot by b7UE

== Shows and films ==
Shows

The Tiger Lillies have appeared in numerous shows, the following are listed according to their premiere date:

- 1998: Shockheaded Peter
- 1998: The Tiger Lillies Circus
- 2004: Punch & Judy
- 2005: The Little Matchgirl
- 2006: Die Weberischen
- 2006: The Mountains of Madness with Alexander Hacke and Danielle de Picciotto
- 2008: 7 Deadly Sins
- 2008: Sinderella with Justin Bond
- 2009: The Tiger Lillies' Freakshow
- 2010: The Ballad of Sexual Dependency with Nan Goldin
- 2010: Cockatoo Prison
- 2010: Here I Am Human!
- 2011: Tom Waits' Rain Dogs Revisited
- 2011: Woyzeck & The Tiger Lillies
- 2012: Rime of the Ancient Mariner
- 2012: The Tiger Lillies Perform Hamlet – nominated for a Reumert Performing Arts Award
- 2013: Either/Or Cabaret
- 2013: Lulu – A Murder Ballad with Opera North
- 2014: A Dream Turns Sour
- 2015: Die Geschichte vom Franz Biberkopf – Schauspiel Frankfurt
- 2016: Love for Sale - The Songs of Cole Porter with Opera North
- 2016: Madame Piaf
- 2017: Cold Night in Soho
- 2017: The Very Worst of the Tiger Lillies
- 2017: Edgar Allan Poe's Haunted Palace - Bergen International Festival
- 2018: Corrido de la Sangre
- 2018: The Last Days of Mankind
- 2019: Rosencrantz & Guildenstern Are Dead
- 2025: A Macbeth Song

Films

- Jake Scott's Plunkett & Macleane (1999)
- Sergei Bodrov's The Quickie (2001) – a music band in celebrations
- Sergei Bodrov's Drunken Sailor (2007) – a documentary on The Tiger Lillies by the director of Oscar-nominated epic Mongol
- Penny Woolcock's The Margate Exodus (2007) – a contemporary re-telling of the Book of Exodus. Martyn Jacques appears in the film as Shebeen Singer performing "Hailstones"
- Dominique de Rivaz's Luftbusiness (2008)
- Valdís Óskarsdóttir's Country Wedding (2008)
- Troma's Lloyd Kaufman's Return to Nuke 'Em High (2013)
- Andrey Proshkin's Orlean (Russian title Орлеан) (2015) – soundtrack
- E.A. Dupont's Variete (1925) (2015) – soundtrack
- Boris Mitić's "In Praise of Nothing" (2017)
