= Voigt/465 =

Australian post-punk band

Voigt/465 were an Australian post-punk band based in Sydney, Australia. They were a feature of the Sydney inner-city music-scene during the late 1970s and their music was critically acclaimed. Their sound was influenced by Krautrock and has been described by a band-member as an "unsettling mixture of song-driven rock elements and free-noise experimentation". Voigt/465 recorded an album, Slights Unspoken, before they disbanded in late 1979. With their self-funded recordings and determinedly uncompromising music Voigt/465 epitomised the do-it-yourself ethic of the alternative music scene of the late 1970s.

== History ==
Voigt/465 was formed in 1976 from a group of school-friends. The band was composed of Rod Pobestek (guitar), Lindsay O’Meara (bass), Phil Turnbull (synthesiser, organ and vocals), Rae Macron Cru (vocals) and Bruce Stalder (drums). They rehearsed and played sporadically during 1977. In 1978 Voigt/465 recorded four songs at Axent Studios at Kogarah, in Sydney's southern suburbs.

During 1978 the band performed more regularly and began to attract a following. In mid-1978 the drummer left the group and was replaced by Mark Boswell. Later that year Voigt/645 released a self-funded single made up of two of the songs they had recorded earlier that year – "State" and "A Secret West". The band had a mid-week residency at the Sussex Hotel and regularly performed at other inner-city venues in Sydney. Voigt/465 also travelled to Melbourne to perform a series of gigs.

Voigt/465 were highlighted as the "band of 1979" in Clinton Walker's influential book Inner City Sound, a document of punk and post-punk music in Australia.

In 1979 the bass-player Lindsay O’Meara decided to leave the band to join Crime and the City Solution in Melbourne. With Voigt/465 on the verge of breaking up the band-members decided to record an album as a lasting document of their songs. The recordings were made at Axent studios and the album Slights Unspoken was released in a limited edition in September 1979.

O’Meara later returned from Melbourne and eventually joined Pel Mel. Keyboardist Phil Turnbull co-founded the band Wild West, which Rae Macron Cru also later joined.

== Discography ==
=== Singles ===
- "State" / "A Secret West" (November 1978)

=== Albums ===
- Slights Unspoken (September 1979) – "Voices A Drama" / "A Welcome Mystery" / "Red Lock on See Steal" / "Imprint" / "Many Risk" / "Is New Is" / "4 Hours" / "P" / "F1" / " Winchsoul"
- One Faint Deluded Smile CD (October 2001; retrospective compilation) – "State" / "A Secret West" / "P" / "A Welcome Mystery (instrumental)" / "Red Lock on Sea Steal" / "Voices A Drama" / "A Welcome Mystery" / "Red Lock on Sea Steal" / "Imprint" / "Many Risk" / "Is New Is" / "4 Hours" / "P" / "F1" / "Winchsoul" / "And the Following Page" / "So Long As One Knows" / "A Welcome Mystery"
- Slights Still Unspoken (2007) – "State" / "Voices A Drama" / "A Welcome Mystery" / "Red Lock on See Steal" / "Imprint" / "Many Risk" / "A Secret West" / "Is New Is" / "4 Hours" / "P" / "F1" / " Winchsoul" / "CD & Download tracks:" / "And the Following Page" / "So Long As One Knows" / "Download live tracks:" / "Remake/Re-model (Roxy Music)" / "Connection (Can)" / "It's A Rainy Day" (Faust)
