= Pel Mel =

Australian rock band

- Also known as: Pel Mel Organisation
- Origin: Newcastle, New South Wales, Australia
- Genres: Post-punk; new wave
- Years active: 1979–1985; 2012–present
- Labels: Primate; GAP/EMI; GAP/CBS
- Past members: see Members

Pel Mel (also styled as pel mel) were an Australian rock band, which formed in Newcastle in June 1979. They issued two studio albums, Out of Reason (1982) and Persuasion (1983). They toured until the end of 1984 and disbanded in the following year. They reformed in 2012 as Pel Mel Organisation to play occasional shows; they have released a compilation and a live album in 2016. In 2023 the band released Late, Late Show, a collection of six songs recorded in 1985.

== History ==
Pel Mel formed in Newcastle, New South Wales in June 1979 with the line-up of Graeme Dunne on guitar and lead vocals, Glenn Hill on bass guitar, Judy "Jude" McGee on saxophone and clarinet (later also on synthesiser and co-lead vocals), her sister, Jane McGee on guitar, Nigel Savage on saxophone and Dave Weston on drums. Australian musicologist, Ian McFarlane, described how their, "Early influences included UK bands like the Cure, Wire, Joy Division, the Fall and Gang of Four, although [they] always mixed the avant-garde with a deceptively simple blend of bright dance beats and catchy new wave pop. During 1979 and 1980, the band had a permanent Friday-night residency at the Grand Hotel in Newcastle, where they were usually supported by electro band The Limp, founded by Tim McGee and also featuring Jude McGee, Dave Weston, Jane McGee, David Whittaker and later Glenn Nelson and others. The Limp issued a single, "Marked Man", in 1981. "[Pel Mel] made little headway on the hard rock-besotted Newcastle pub circuit" and the group began playing regularly in Sydney at venues such as The Rock Garden, The Bayswater Tavern, French's and Beirut by Night.

In early 1980 Savage left and late that year, Lindsay O'Meara (ex-Voigt/465, Crime and the City Solution) replaced Hill on bass guitar. The group relocated to Sydney in February of that year. Pel Mel's first single, "No Word from China", was originally recorded at the Double Jay, radio station studio and was released on the band's own label, Primate Records, in January 1981. McFarlane observed, "[it] won instant favour among discerning critics and new wave fans." The Canberra Times' correspondent felt, "[it] has one of the catchiest melodies and one of the most haunting female voices I've heard for yonks. Just try to stop humming the chorus after you've heard it a few times; an amazing first release from a young band full of promise. The only short comings are in the production."

Jane McGee left the group in February 1981 to travel and Craig Robertson replaced O'Meara on bass guitar late that year. The band performed their single on the national TV pop music show, Countdown. The track was subsequently re-mastered and re-released through GAP Records in June. Debbie Muir of The Canberra Times, described how, "The original pressing suffered from the inevitable effects of bringing out a disc on the cheap, but the song was a classic... a new pressing which has given heaps more oomph to the record, making it worth buying and listening to."

Pel Mel issued two more singles, "Head Above Water" (December 1981) and "Blind Lead the Blind" (November 1982). By July of that year they had supported the Australian leg of a tour by Elvis Costello, taking in Sydney, Melbourne and Adelaide. McGee told Heather P of Tharunka, "The exposure was good because a lot of people (and industry people) got to see the band, even though they didn't choose to. A lot of people had heard of the band but had never seen us play, so it was good in that respect." They released their debut album, Out of Reason, in December 1982 via GAP/EMI. It was produced by Tony Cohen and McFarlane felt, "[it] boasted an appealing sound as displayed on the singles."

Robertson left early in 1983. They toured extensively, playing alongside local bands, the Reels, Mental as Anything and the Birthday Party, as well as supporting international acts New Order and the Fall. Pel Mel's second album, Persuasion, was recorded by Dunne on vocals, bass guitar and guitar, Jude McGee on vocals, keyboards and saxophone and Weston on drums with new member, Paul Davies, on guitar. It was also produced by Cohen and was released by GAP/CBS in October 1983, which "highlighted the band's increasing confidence and maturing songwriting skills. It featured a couple of the band's most captivating songs."

Pel Mel moved from an early punk-influenced sound to a distinctive pop sound, and were a backbone of the thriving inner Sydney music scene in the early 1980s. Other bands from that era were Wild West, Tactics, the Particles, Scapa Flow and the bands from the M Squared label and studio. Clinton Walker in his 1984 book, The Next Thing, stated, "that at the moment they have the best chance of breaking into the mainstream for the same reasons they have for the past two years: excellent musicianship, appealing pop styles, danceability, wit, charm, commercial digestibility and a well-earned live track record as a sometimes great, often good and seldom bad experience." McFarlane found that Pel Mel, "toured until the end of 1984, but ran out of steam without breaking into the mainstream consciousness."

"No Word from China" was included on Tales from the Australian Underground, a collection of key Australian independent singles from 1976 to 1989. They were cited as an influence by Australia's later rock acts. In 2003, Glen Bennie of Underground Lovers, cited them as one of his favourite bands, with Persuasion one of his top three Australian records. Australian social commentator, academic and writer, Philip Brophy, cited Pel Mel as a representative of the Australian musical avant garde rock in his essay, "Avant-Garde Rock – History in the Making", which was published in the 1987 book, Missing in Action: Australian Popular Music in Perspective (edited Marcus Breen). The group's track, "Pandemonium", was covered by Sobriquet Vs Other People's Children on a compilation album, Re-fashioned – Antipodean Classics via the Groovescooter label in 2001.

In March 2012 the group reformed as Pel Mel Organisation, with an expanded line up of Dunne, Judy and Jane McGee, Paul and Mark Davies, Dermot Browne and Stuart Nichols. They played shows in Sydney under that name and their original name. A compilation album, Rags to Tatters – the best of pel mel and a live album, I'm a TV: pel mel live 1979–1984, were released in September 2016. Bernard Zuel of The Sydney Morning Herald rated the compilation album at four-out-of-five stars and explained, "[it] mixes coolly distant funk underneath Judy McGee's surprisingly yearning vocals, this compilation of a long-lost Sydney underground band asks several questions... Mostly seen in the inner city, sadly folding after only two albums, they were a bridge from post-punk's flint-eyed but danceable paranoia to '80s pop-electro. They were also very good."

Jude McGee and Dermot Browne released an album of new material in 2016 on the Blue Jube label under the name 'Jude McGee and the Soft Touch'. The album – "The Household Guide to Heartbreak" – also gathered some positive critical reviews.

In November 2018, Jude McGee, Graeme Dunne and Dermot Browne recorded and released three tracks – "I'm a TV", "Continuing Imprisonment" and "Clever Move" – under the 'pel mel organisation' name. The songs were originally written and performed by pel mel in 1979, but had never been recorded in a studio. They are available via iTunes and Bandcamp.

In 2023 the label Efficient Space released Late, Late Show, a collection of six Pel Mel tracks recorded in 1985.

In 2024, Jude McGee and Dermot Browne formed the band The Smoking Ruins, along with members Rebecca Gow, Leah Horsley, Suzy Goodwin and Peter Timmerman. An EP featuring Browne and McGee's original compositions is due for release in late November 2026, with an album due for release in the first half of 2027.

== Members ==
- Graeme Dunne – rhythm guitar, lead vocals, bass guitar (1979–85, 2012–present)
- Glenn Hill – bass guitar (1979–80)
- Jane McGee – guitar (1979–81, 2012-2015)
- Judy McGee – saxophone, clarinet, synthesiser, co-lead vocals (1979–85, 2012–present)
- Nigel Savage – saxophone (1979–80)
- Dave Weston – drums (1979–85, 2012–present)
- Lindsay O'Meara – bass guitar (1980–81)
- Craig Robertson – bass guitar (1981–83)
- Paul Davies – guitar, bass guitar (1983–84)
- Dermot Browne – guitar, bass guitar (2012–present)
- Mark Davies – bass guitar (2012–2015)
- Stuart Nichols – drums (2012–2015)

== Discography ==
=== Studio albums ===
List of albums, with Australian chart positions
Title	Album details	Peak chart positions
Title	Album details	AUS
Out of Reason	Released: December 1982; Format: LP, Cassette; Label: GAP (GAPLP2001)	–
Persuasion	Released: October 1983; Format: LP, Cassette; Label: GAP (GAPA2002)	83

=== Compilation albums ===
Title	Album details
Rags to Tatters – The Best of Pel Mel	Released: September 2016; Format: CD, Download; Label: Blue Jube

=== Live albums ===
Title	Album details
Live 1980	Released: Format: Label: Inner City Sound (1808CD)
I'm a TV: Pel Mel Live 1979–1984	Released: September 2016; Format: CD, download; Label: BlueJube

=== EPs ===
Title	Album details
Late, Late Show	Released: 2023; Format: 12" vinyl EP, Download; Label: Efficient Space

=== Singles ===
Year	Title	Album
1981	"No Word from China"	non album single
1981	"Head Above Water"	non album single
1982	"Blind Lead the Blind" / "Water"	Out of Reason
1983	"Shoes Should Fit"	Out of Reason
1983	"Pandemonium"	Persuasion
