= American Twilight =

Studio album by Crime & the City Solution
- Released: March 26, 2013
- Recorded: Classix, West Footscray, Victoria; The Tempermill, Ferndale, MI
- Genre: Post-punk
- Length: 41:03
- Label: Mute
- Producers: Crime & the City Solution, David Feeny

Crime & the City Solution chronology
| A History of Crime (2012) | American Twilight (2013) |

Professional ratings
Aggregate scores
| Source | Rating |
|---|---|
| Metacritic | (77/100) |
Review scores
| Source | Rating |
| Allmusic | 4/5 stars |
| Drowned in Sound | (7/10) |
| Mojo | 3/5 stars |
| PopMatters | (7/10) |
| Q | 4/5 stars |
| Uncut | 4/5 stars |

American Twilight is the fifth studio album by Crime & the City Solution, released on March 26, 2013 through Mute Records. The album was recorded after a 23-year hiatus that found the band relocating from Berlin to Detroit.

== Reception ==
In The Sunday Times, Stewart Lee said, "Returning to active service, the band takes a global perspective. Here's an unexpectedly cohesive set of intelligent, classy, and thunderous widescreen alterno-rock destined to raise the roofs of publicly funded venues in any European cities that still have an arts budget." Q said it was "lifted above cliche and works best when heading full pelt toward the horizon.

AllMusic said it was "more than just a triumphant comeback by C&CS - who were not fully appreciated for their uniqueness the first time around - it is a literate, sprawling, bruising rock & roll record that convincingly addresses the crises we face - cultural, spiritual, integral - and the choices we make."

== Track listing ==
All tracks are written by Crime & the City Solution.

| No. | Title | Length |
|---|---|---|
| 1. | "Goddess" | 3:49 |
| 2. | "My Love Takes Me There" | 4:09 |
| 3. | "Riven Man" | 4:33 |
| 4. | "Domina" | 6:48 |
| 5. | "The Colonel (Doesn't Call Anymore)" | 6:30 |
| 6. | "Beyond Good and Evil" | 4:08 |
| 7. | "American Twilight" | 5:18 |
| 8. | "Streets of West Memphis" | 5:48 |

== Personnel ==
Crime & the City Solution

- Bronwyn Adams – violin, backing vocals
- Simon Bonney – vocals
- Danielle de Picciotto – autoharp, backing vocals
- David Eugene Edwards – guitar, backing vocals
- Troy Gregory – bass guitar, cello, backing vocals
- Alexander Hacke – guitar, backing vocals
- Matthew Smith – keyboards, backing vocals
- Jim White – drums

Production and additional personnel

- Churibina – backing vocals
- Brandon Cooper – trumpet
- Crime & the City Solution – production
- David Feeny – production, engineering, mixing, mastering, pedal steel guitar
- Tony Hamera – engineering
- Casey Rice – engineering
- Bradley Stern – tenor saxophone
- Olga Volchkova – cover model
