= Shockheaded Peter (musical) =

Musical based on a German children's book

- Music: Adrian Huge; Martyn Jacques; Adrian Stout
- Lyrics: Martyn Jacques
- Book: Julian Bleach; Anthony Cairns; Graeme Gilmour; Tamzin Griffin
- Basis: Struwwelpeter by Heinrich Hoffmann
- Productions: 1998 West Yorkshire; 1999 Off-Broadway; 2002 West End; 2005 Off-Broadway revival
- Awards: 1999 Critics' Circle Theatre Award for Best Design; 2002 Laurence Olivier Award for Best Entertainment

Shockheaded Peter is a 1998 musical using the popular German children's book Struwwelpeter (1845) by Heinrich Hoffmann as its basis.

Created by Julian Bleach, Anthony Cairns, Julian Crouch, Graeme Gilmour, Tamzin Griffin, Jo Pocock, Phelim McDermott, Michael Morris and The Tiger Lillies (Martyn Jacques, Adrian Huge and Adrian Stout) the production combines elements of pantomime and puppetry with musical versions of the poems with the songs generally following the text but with a somewhat darker tone. Whereas the children in the poems only sometimes die, in the musical they all do. Commissioned by the West Yorkshire Playhouse in Leeds and the Lyric Hammersmith in West London, the show debuted in 1998 in Leeds before moving to London and subsequently to world tours.

While the Tiger Lillies performed as onstage band for the majority of the original Leeds and London runs, they were later replaced by David Thomas & Two Pale Boys.

== Productions ==
- 1998 West Yorkshire Playhouse
- 1999 New Victory Theater
- 1999 Kennedy Center Eisenhower Theater
- 2000 American Conservatory Theater San Francisco
- 2001 Athenaeum Theatre Chicago
- 2004 Lyric Hammersmith
- 2005 Little Shubert Theatre
- 2006 ETA Hoffmann Theater Bamberg
- 2008 Theater Krefeld und Mönchengladbach
- 2008 die SCHOTTE. Erfurt
- 2009 Burgtheater
- 2010 Grillo-Theater Essen
- 2011 Theater Heidelberg
- 2013 Det Norske Teatret
- 2013 Freilichtspiele Schwäbisch Hall
- 2014 Staatstheater Cottbus
- 2015 Company One
- 2015 Green Valley Theatre Company
- 2015 Schauspiel Hannover
- 2016 Slovene National Theatre Nova Gorica
- 2017 Cygnet Theatre, San Diego
- 2017 Black Button Eyes Productions, Chicago
- 2019 Utah State University
- 2021 Jobsite Theater, Tampa
- 2021 New Moon Theatre, Memphis
- 2022 Staatstheater Meiningen
- 2024 Scala Wien
- 2026 Badische Landesbühne

== Awards and nominations ==
Awards

- 1998 Barclays/TMA Best Director Award
- 1999 Critics' Circle Theatre Award for Best Design
- 2002 Laurence Olivier Award for Best Entertainment
- 2002 Laurence Olivier Award for Best Performance in a Supporting Role (Martyn Jacques)

Nominations

- 1999 South Bank Show Award Theatre
- 2000 Drama Desk Award for Unique Theatrical Experience
- 2000 Drama Desk Award for Best Set Design for a Musical
- 2000 Drama Desk Award for Best Costume Design
- 2002 Laurence Olivier Award for Best Director
- 2002 Laurence Olivier Award for Best Set Design
- 2002 Laurence Olivier Award for Best Costume Design
