= Paradise Discotheque =

Studio album by Crime & the City Solution
- Released: September 3, 1990
- Recorded: November 1989
- Studio: Conny's Studio, Wolperath, Germany
- Genre: Post-punk
- Length: 38:37
- Label: Mute
- Producer: Chrislo Haas

Crime & the City Solution chronology
The Bride Ship (1989)	Paradise Discotheque (1990)	A History of Crime (2012)

Professional ratings
Review scores
Source	Rating
Allmusic	4.5/5 stars
Entertainment Weekly	B−

Paradise Discotheque is the fourth studio album by Crime & the City Solution, released on September 3, 1990 through Mute Records.

== Accolades ==
Year	Publication	Country	Accolade	Rank
1990	Sounds	United Kingdom	"Albums of the Year"	23
1990	Select	United Kingdom	"Albums of the Year"	41

== Track listing ==
All lyrics are written by Bronwyn Adams and Simon Bonney except the traditional ballad "Motherless Child"; all music is composed by Crime & the City Solution.

No.	Title	Length
1.	"I Have the Gun"	3:34
2.	"The Sly Persuaders"	4:10
3.	"The Dolphins and the Sharks"	4:43
4.	"The Sun Before the Darkness"	5:15
5.	"Motherless Child"	3:49
6.	"The Last Dictator I"	4:40
7.	"The Last Dictator II"	5:01
8.	"The Last Dictator III"	4:33
9.	"The Last Dictator IV"	2:48

== Personnel ==
Crime & the City Solution

- Bronwyn Adams – violin
- Simon Bonney – vocals
- Chrislo Haas – guitar, synthesizer, production
- Alexander Hacke – guitar, illustrations
- Mick Harvey – drums, piano
- Thomas Stern – bass guitar

Production and additional personnel

- Bruno Gebhard – recording
- Gareth Jones – engineering, recording
- Ingo Krauss – recording
