= Pop Crimes =

Studio album by Rowland S. Howard
- Released: 16 October 2009
- Recorded: Summer 2008 – Winter 2009
- Studio: Birdland Studios, Melbourne
- Length: 38:19
- Label: Liberation (Australia); Fat Possum (US)
- Producer: Lindsay Gravina

Rowland S. Howard chronology
Teenage Snuff Film (1999)	Pop Crimes (2009)

Professional ratings
Review scores
Source	Rating
PopMatters	9/10
AllMusic	4/5 stars
NME	4/5 stars
Record Collector	4/5 stars

Pop Crimes is the second solo album by Australian musician Rowland S. Howard, released on 16 October 2009. The album was released ten years after Howard's previous solo album Teenage Snuff Film, and 2 1/2 months before his death from liver cancer on 30 December. Pop Crimes was released in the United States by Fat Possum Records in August 2014. Remastered versions of both Howard's solo albums were released by Mute Records in Europe, Fat Possum in America and Bloodlines in Australia on 27 March 2020.

== Track listing ==
All tracks are written by Rowland S. Howard, except where noted.

No.	Title	Writer(s)	Length
1.	"(I Know) A Girl Called Jonny"	Howard; Jonnine Standish	3:51
2.	"Shut Me Down"		4:20
3.	"Life's What You Make It"	Tim Friese-Greene; Mark Hollis	6:42
4.	"Pop Crimes"	Howard; Brian Hooper	7:23
5.	"Nothin"	Townes van Zandt	3:51
6.	"Wayward Man"		3:42
7.	"Ave Maria"		4:01
8.	"The Golden Age of Bloodshed"		4:29
Total length:			38:23

== Personnel ==
- Rowland S. Howard – vocals and guitar
- Mick Harvey – drums and organ
- J.P. Shilo – guitar, violin, "general strangeness" and bass guitar (except track 1, 5, 8)

with:

- Brian Hooper – bass guitar (6,8)
- Sean Stewart – bass guitar (1)
- Jonnine Standish – vocals (1)

Technical

- Ken Taylor – artwork, design
- Karl Scullin – cover photography
