= The Bride Ship =

Studio album by Crime & the City Solution
- Released: April 17, 1989
- Recorded: June–August 1988
- Studio: Hansa Tonstudio (Berlin, DE)
- Genre: Post-punk
- Length: 46:07
- Label: Mute
- Producer: Gareth Jones

Crime & the City Solution chronology
Shine (1988)	The Bride Ship (1989)	Paradise Discotheque (1990)

Professional ratings
Review scores
Source	Rating
AllMusic	3.5/5 stars

The Bride Ship is the third studio album by Crime & the City Solution, released on July 11, 1989 through Mute Records.

== Track listing ==
All lyrics are written by Bonney, except where noted; all music is composed by Crime & the City Solution

No.	Title	Lyrics	Length
1.	"The Shadow of No Man"		5:26
2.	"The Greater Head"	Adams, Bonney	4:22
3.	"Stone"		4:12
4.	"The Dangling Man"		4:30
5.	"Keepsake"		4:40
6.	"The Bride Ship"		6:22
7.	"Free World"		3:11
8.	"New World"	Adams	3:29
9.	"Three/Four"		3:16
10.	"The Bride Ship"		6:24

== Personnel ==
Crime & the City Solution

- Bronwyn Adams – violin
- Simon Bonney – vocals
- Chrislo Haas – guitar, synthesizer
- Alexander Hacke – guitar
- Mick Harvey – drums, piano
- Thomas Stern – bass guitar

Production and additional personnel

- Bleddyn Butcher – photography
- Crime & the City Solution – mixing
- Ralph Droge – trombone
- Peter Gruchot – photography
- David Heilmann – engineering
- Gareth Jones – production, mixing
- Miles Standish – photography
- Victor Van Vugt – engineering, mixing
