= Crime & the City Solution =

Australian rock band

- Crime & the City Solution c. 1990, left to right: Thomas Stern, Alexander Hacke, Simon Bonney, Bronwyn Adams and Mick Harvey

Background information
- Origin: Sydney, New South Wales, Australia
- Genres: Post-punk, art punk, punk blues
- Years active: 1977–1979, 1985–1991, 2012–present
- Labels: Mute, Possum, Rampant, BMG, Arista
- Members: Simon Bonney; Bronwyn Adams; Joshua Murphy
- Past members: see members list below

Crime & the City Solution is an Australian rock band formed in late 1977 by singer-songwriter and mainstay Simon Bonney. They disbanded in 1979 leaving only bootleg recordings and demos. In late 1983, Bonney moved to London and in 1985 he formed a new version of the group which included members of the recently disbanded The Birthday Party. They eventually settled in West-Berlin and issued four albums – Room of Lights (1986), Shine (1988), The Bride Ship (1989) and Paradise Discotheque (1990) – before disbanding again in 1991. In 2012, Bonney reformed the band in Detroit with two veterans of its Berlin era and a handful of new members.

Critic David Sheridan described the band's music as characterized by slow tempos, dark moods and Bonney's forlorn vocals, all of which can range from "endurance testing" at worst to "hauntingly beautiful" at best.

== History ==
Crime & the City Solution are an Australian rock group which formed in late 1977 in Sydney with a line-up of Simon Bonney on lead vocals, Phil Kitchener on bass guitar, Dave MacKinnon on saxophone, Don McLennan (ex-Particles) on drums and Harry Zantey on guitar. The group has had five distinct line-ups with Bonney as the only mainstay: Sydney in 1977–78, Melbourne in 1979, two groupings in Berlin from 1985 to 1990, and Detroit from 2012 onwards. In the late 1970s Bonney had met McLennan and sometimes provided guest vocals for McLennan's group, The Particles. According to Australian rock music historian, Ian McFarlane, The Particles had "a cult following around the inner-city Sydney scene courtesy of its delightful, melodious pop sound". In contrast, according to Peter Nelson of Pulp fanzine, Crime & the City Solution, used "An exciting blend of fuzzed monotone guitar runs and squawking saxophone riffs . . . [like] the drone songs on Wire's Pink Flag".

In late 1978 Bonney and McLennan had relocated to Melbourne where they formed a new version of Crime & the City Solution with Chris Astley on keyboards, Kim Beissel on saxophone, Lindsay O'Meara on bass guitar (ex-Voigt/465) and Dan Wallace-Crabbe on guitar. In Melbourne Bonney became friends with local post-punk group, The Boys Next Door (later known as The Birthday Party). Crime & the City Solution broke up in 1979 after a number of live shows and recording an unreleased demo. Wallace-Crabbe later joined Laughing Clowns, O'Meara returned to Sydney and joined Pel Mel, Beissel played in → ↑ →, Astley and McLennan in other bands.

In late 1983 Bonney moved to London and reconnected with members of The Birthday Party. In 1985 he formed another version of Crime & the City Solution in London with Mick Harvey on drums, keyboards and bass guitar and Rowland S. Howard on guitar and backing vocals. Howard's younger brother, Harry, soon joined on bass guitar. In June 1985 the group's debut four-track EP, The Dangling Man, was released by Mute Records in the UK and Possum Records in Australia. McFarlane found the EP provided "a gloomy, stripped-down, blues-flavoured sound". A six-track EP, Just South of Heaven, followed in September for UK release only. It was "cleaner, more powerful set of songs dominated by Bonney's dramatic vocals and chilling instrumentation". After this release, Epic Soundtracks (aka Kevin Godfrey, ex-Swell Maps) joined on drums which freed Harvey to concentrate on keyboards and guitar. In 1986 Bronwyn Adams, Bonney's domestic partner, joined on violin and backing vocals. In early 1986 the band released a third EP Kentucky Click.

With the line-up of Adams, Bonney, Harvey, Rowland and Harry Howard, and Soundtracks, Crime & the City Solution recorded its debut album, Room of Lights, produced by the band, Flood and Tony Cohen. They recorded the album in Berlin. On 27 October 1986 it was released in the UK on Mute Records. Amy Hanson of Allmusic praised it as "rough and ready rock that slotted itself nicely under a gothic canvas – they were and remain post-punk's forgotten kings ... Its urgency jangles, its cacophony is dichotomous, and, at times, the underlying energy is breathtaking as the band storms through a great set". Late that year the Howard brothers and Soundtracks left to form their own group, These Immortal Souls.

In 1987 Adams, Bonney and Harvey recruited Chrislo Haas (D.A.F., Liaisons Dangereuses) on synthesiser, Alexander Hacke (Einstürzende Neubauten) on guitar and Thomas Stern on bass guitar. In Australia in March 1988, Rampant Records issued a compilation, Room of Lights, with tracks from the UK releases, Just South of Heaven and Room of Lights. On 25 April that year Crime & the City Solution issued their second album, Shine, which Allmusic's Ned Raggett felt was "a touch less classically smooth and arranged, more rough around the edges and jagged, especially with Bonney's delivery ... his lyrics come across as distinctly unfriendly to a usual verse/chorus structure, sounding like a spoken-word recitation sung a line at a time". In November Craig Lee described their performance at Bogart's for the Los Angeles Times, "For what is purportedly a loosely structured outfit, this group displayed a remarkable cohesiveness. At times the band has the earthy feel of both old blues and country sounds and the slightly mystical aura of the early Doors. But rather than rehash time-worn styles, the Solution translates these forms into its own introspective idioms". Alternative rocker Mark Lanegan cited Shine as one of his favourite albums, "[it] is succinct and is great from start to finish. There’s a great sense of space on this record that’s fantastic but the thing that I’m most drawn to is the melancholy on some of those songs. But it also has a cinematic quality".

On 17 April 1989 Crime & the City Solution released their third album, The Bride Ship, for which Raggett found them "continue carving its own strange path. ... Harvey doubtless contributes most of the organ work. Simon Bonney continues to evolve into more of his own man – if anything, he's embracing country and western more explicitly in his singing style". The Bride Ship was issued in Australia by BMG and Arista Records.

On 3 September 1990 Crime & the City Solution's fourth studio album, Paradise Discotheque, appeared. It had been recorded between November 1989 to March 1990 and was produced by Haas. The group disbanded late in 1991 and on 4 October 1993 a live album, The Adversary – Live, was released. By 1991 Bonney had moved to Los Angeles where he released two solo albums, Forever (1992) and Everyman (1994).

In late 2011, Bonney was based in Detroit and announced that Crime & the City Solution would re-form to record a new album for Mute Records in 2012. Personnel are Bonney, Adams, Hacke, David Eugene Edwards (of US bands 16 Horsepower and Woven Hand), Detroit musician Troy Gregory, Matthew Smith, Jim White (of the Australian group Dirty Three), and Danielle de Picciotto (married to Hacke). Their album American Twilight was recorded in Detroit and released in 2013.

The band's album the killer was self-released on Bandcamp in October 2023. Bonney and Adams, returning to Berlin, were joined by Frederic Lyenn (keyboards, bass), Donald Baldie (guitar), Georgio Valentino and Joshua Murphy (guitars, keyboards), and Chris Hughes (drums). The album was produced by Martin J. Fiedler, who also contributed additional keyboards.

The line up for the band's 2026 Australian tour was Bonney, Adams, Joshua Murphy, bassist Tim Bignell, and drummer Cory Keem. Bignell and Keem are both from Australian band "Cosmonaut".

== Members ==
Sydney 1977–1978

- Simon Bonney – vocals
- Don McLennan – drums
- Harry Zantey – guitar
- Phil Kitchener – bass (deceased)
- Dave MacKinnon – soprano & tenor saxophone

Melbourne 1979

- Simon Bonney – vocals
- Don McLennan – drums
- Dan Wallace-Crabbe – guitar
- Lindsay O'Meara – bass
- Chris Astley – keyboards (deceased)
- Kim Beissel – alto saxophone

Berlin/London 1985–1986

- Simon Bonney – vocals
- Mick Harvey – guitar, keyboards
- Rowland S. Howard – guitar (deceased)
- Harry Howard – bass
- Epic Soundtracks – drums (deceased)

Berlin 1987–1991

- Simon Bonney – vocals
- Mick Harvey – drums
- Bronwyn Adams – violin
- Alexander Hacke – guitar
- Chrislo Haas – synthesizer (deceased)
- Thomas Stern – bass

Detroit 2012–2013

- Simon Bonney – vocals
- Bronwyn Adams – violin
- Alexander Hacke – guitar
- David Eugene Edwards – guitar
- Troy Gregory – bass
- Danielle de Picciotto – visuals
- Matthew Smith – keyboards/synthesizer
- Jim White – drums

Berlin 2022–present

- Simon Bonney – vocals
- Bronwyn Adams – violin, vocals
- Chris Hughes – drums, percussion
- Frederic Lyenn Jacques – bass, synth, piano, guitar
- Georgio Valentino – synthesizer, guitar
- Joshua Murphy – guitar, synth, piano
- Donald Baldie – guitar, piano

== Discography ==
Studio albums

- Room of Lights (1986)
- Shine (1988)
- The Bride Ship (1989)
- Paradise Discotheque (1990)
- American Twilight (2013)
- The Killer (2023)

EPs

- The Dangling Man (1985)
- Just South of Heaven (1985)
- The Kentucky Click / Adventure (1986)
- On Every Train (Grain Will Bear Grain) (1988)
- The Shadow Of No Man (1989)
- I Have The Gun (1990)
- The Dolphins And The Sharks (1991)

Live

- The Adversary – Live (1993)

Compilations

- A History of Crime (2012)

== Miscellaneous ==
- Wim Wenders, who was a fan of the band, featured them performing "Six Bells Chime" in his film Wings of Desire. Also, the song "The Adversary" was included in the soundtrack to the Wenders film Until the end of the World.
- Bandmember Bronwyn Adams is married to vocalist Simon Bonney. Her late brother Bruno Adams was the vocalist in the band named "Once Upon A Time", who were produced by Mick Harvey, and he was later in the band named "Fatal Shore" (Prague/Berlin).
