= Danielle de Picciotto =

American artist, musician and filmmaker

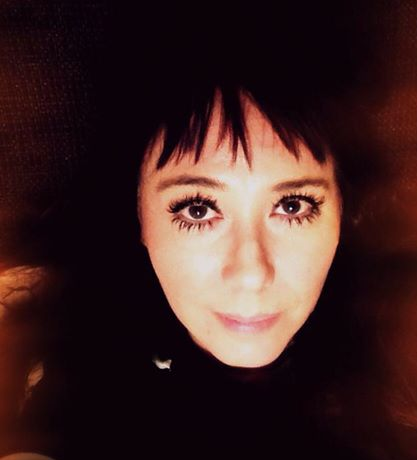
Danielle de Picciotto

Danielle de Picciotto (born February 19, 1965) is an American-born artist, musician and filmmaker. She was born in Tacoma, Washington, United States and currently lives and works in Berlin, Germany. In 1989 she founded, along with her then partner Dr. Motte, the first Berlin Love Parade.

== Biography ==
De Picciotto was the initiator of Berlin's "Clubart Movement" in 1992. She was vocalist for Space Cowboys and The Ocean Club (with Gudrun Gut). She was curator of the Gallery „Das Institut“ from 1996-1987, created the exhibition and event series "Kunst oder König / in", to promote Berlin artists, DJs, and musicians. She was a member of the Berlin art movement Pop Surrealism. She sang for Die Haut together with Anita Lane, Nick Cave and Kid Congo Powers.

In 2006 she married her longtime partner Alexander Hacke, the bassist of Einstürzende Neubauten.

De Picciotto collaborates with the Goethe Institut internationally on presenting Berlin's cultural scene and was commissioned by the German Foreign Ministry to direct a short film on European Club Culture in 2008. In 2012, she became a member of the band Crime & the City Solution.

She was featured as an important artist in the documentary In Berlin by Michael Ballhaus and Ciro Cappellari.

In 2016, she was invited to do a course on interdisciplinary performance at the HfG at ZKM Center for Media Art in Karlsruhe. Panels and talks have also been also offered at New York University, Berlin and the Folkwang University, Bochum.

== Discography and other released media ==
=== Albums and singles ===
==== Space Cowboys ====
- 1991 Locked And Loaded (LP)
- 1993 "Terrorist" (Single)

==== Ocean Club ====
- 1996 Pearl (LP)
- 1996 Obsession (LP)

==== Collaborations with Alexander Hacke ====
- 2011 Hitman's Heel (CD)
- 2016 Perseverantia (CD/LP)
- 2017 Unity (CD/LP)
- 2018 Menetekel (CD/LP)
- 2018 Joy (CD)
- 2020 The Current (CD/LP)
- 2021 The Silver Threshold (CD/LP)
- 2022 Keepsakes (CD/LP)
- 2024 The Best of Hackedepicciotto - Live in Napoli (CD/LP)

==== Solo albums ====
- 2015 Tacoma (CD)
- 2019 Deliverance (LP)
- 2020 The Element of Love (LP)

=== Collaborations ===
- 1995 Waiting Divamania; Digivalley
- 1992 Cheerio Malarias
- 1997 No Go Die Haut
- 2005 Nackte Hunde Mermer Records
- 2013 American Twilight CD with Crime & the City Solution from Mute Records
- 2014 The Ministry of Wolves album release in collaboration with Mick Harvey, Alexander Hacke, Paul Wallfisch
- 2017 Monika Werkstatt (CD/LP)
- 2017 Monika Werkstatt Remixes (LP)
- 2019 Monika Werkstatt Ambient Session Day 1 (LP)
- 2019 Monika Werkstatt Ambient Session Day 2 (LP)

=== Films and music videos ===
- 2001 Directed a music video for Einstürzende Neubauten's Alexander Hacke on his world recording tour of Sanctuary
- 2002 "La Ballade De" John Massis music video for Fred Alpi - Paris
- 2002 "Rock On" music video for Martin Dean - Berlin
- 2002 Kleiner Dicker Junge music video for Electrocute - Los Angeles
- 2004 Einstürzende Neubauten - on tour with neubauten.org, film documentary
- 2006 Throbbing Gristle; Berlin, film documentary
- 2007 Director, The Mountains of Madness, with The Tiger Lillies and Alexander Hacke.
- 2008 The Ship Of Fools, DVD/CD film documentary and CD together with Alexander Hacke
- 2009 Sternentanz, director. An animated short on club culture commissioned by the German Foreign Ministry
- 2009 In Berlin, Protagonist in the Berlin documentary by Michael Ballhaus and Ciro Cappellari
- 2009 Do You Love me as Much as I Love You, Protagonist in the Documentary on Nick Cave and the Bad Seeds by Iain Forsyth and Jane Pollard
- 2010 How Long Is Now, Film documentary DVD
- 2012 The Glasshouse, Film documentary DVD
- 2015 Not Junk Yet: The Art of Lary 7 Film Documentary

=== Books ===
- 2012 The Beauty of Transgression - A Berlin Memoir Publisher: Gestalten Verlag
- 2013 We are Gypsies Now - Der Weg ins Ungewisse Graphic Diary Publisher: Metrolit Verlag Berlin
- 2015 We Are Gypsies Now released in the US by AMOK books
- 2020 Die Heitere Kunst der Rebellion, Graphic Novel, Published by Graf& Graf
- 2023 Gesamtkunstwerk 1987-2023 Kunstkatalog

=== Other media ===
- 2002 Initiated Bada Bing, a music event series, together with partner Alexander Hacke
- 2011 Invited to do a five-month art residency at the Meetfactory in Prague
- 2014 Republik der Wölfe Theater music composed and performed live at Theater Dortmund together with Mick Harvey, Alexander Hacke, Paul Wallfisch
