= Martyn Jacques =

British musician, singer and songwriter (born 1959)

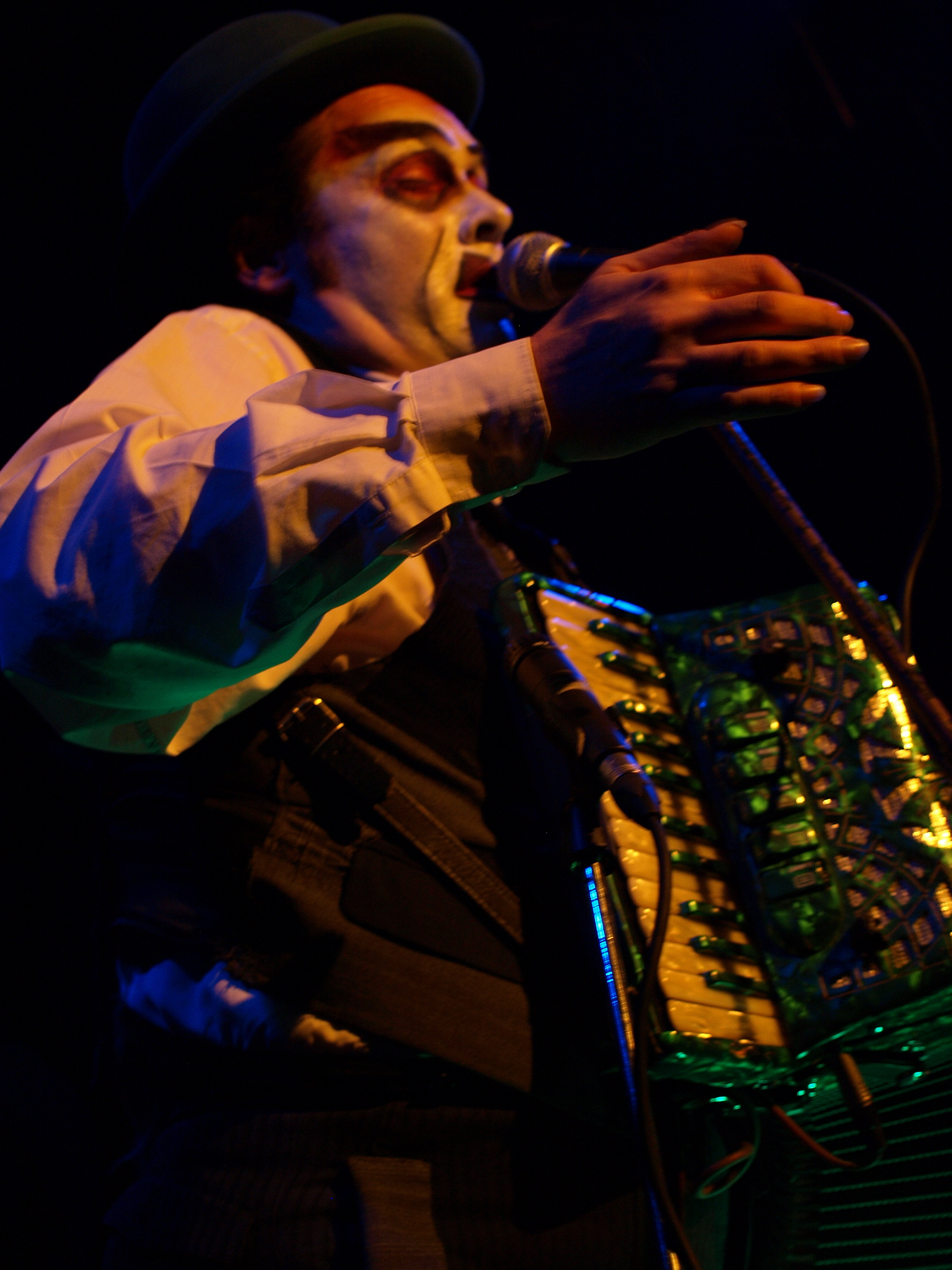
- Martyn Jacques during a live performance with the Tiger Lillies in Kaserne Basel, Switzerland on 29 December 2007.

Background information
- Born: 22 May 1959 (age 67)
- Occupations: singer, songwriter
- Instruments: accordion, piano, ukulele
- Label: Misery Guts Music

Martyn Jacques (born 22 May 1959) is a British musician, singer and songwriter, mostly known as the founder and front man of cult British trio The Tiger Lillies.

== Life and career ==
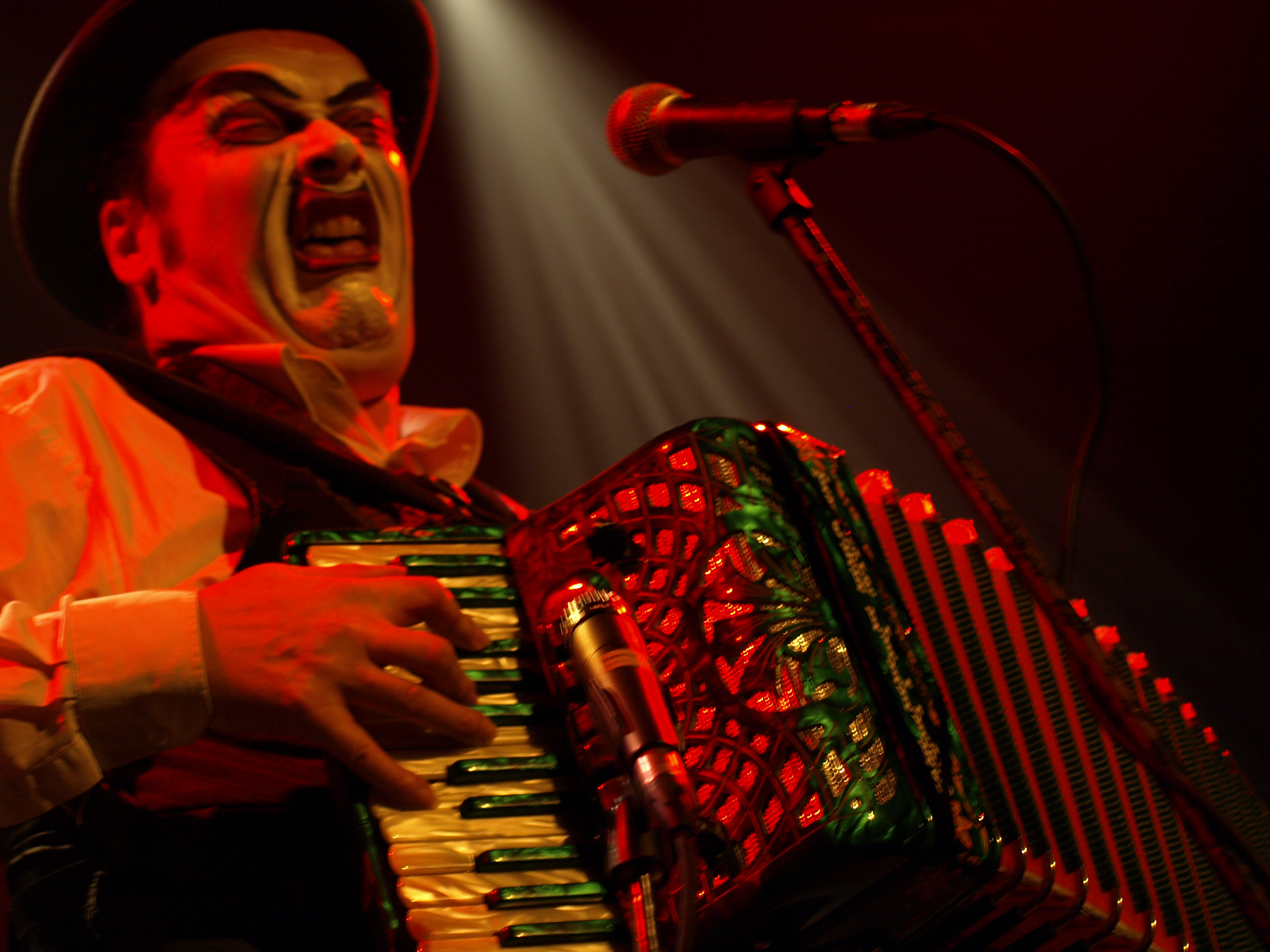
Martyn Jacques during a live performance with The Tiger Lillies in Kaserne Basel, Switzerland, on 29 December 2007.

Martyn Jacques grew up in Slough. His song "Slough" on YouTube on the 1996 The Tiger Lillies release "The Brothel to The Cemetery" concerns his childhood memories, echoing John Betjeman's 1937 poem.

As a child, he had piano lessons from Florence De Jong.

In his early 20s he dropped out of Lampeter's Theology and Philosophy course and headed to London where he initially lived in a squat in Finsbury Park and then in a flat in Soho's Rupert Street where he got a pretty good taste of the lowlife which became his main source of inspiration. He spent his whole 20s training as a musician and singer and developing his characteristic falsetto voice, which has led to him being known as the infamous Criminal Castrato , a description first coined by Ken Campbell.

In his Tiger Lillies appearances, Jacques commonly sings about "sexual perversions, seedy underbellies, the gruesome, macabre and visceral". Jacques has been described as enjoying when audience members walk out of his shows, noting "It's always funny when people are offended by what I do ... after all, I'm just an entertainer."

Jacques' songs range from hilarious, dark, up-beat music, even darker, strange and mysterious songs and some cover versions, such as "My Funny Valentine" and "Send in the Clowns". He is the musical director of the junk opera Shockheaded Peter.

== Discography ==
- Various Artists - Дед Мороз Против Анти Деда Мороза Bad Taste Новый Год (2002) "Merry Christmas and a Happy New Year"
- The Real Tuesday Weld - I, Lucifer (2004) "Someday"
- The Real Tuesday Weld - Les Aperitifs Et Les Digestifs (2004) "Someday"
- Various Artists - Blood, Muscle & Air: The Intimate Voice (2008) "The Pedophile in the Park"
- The Real Tuesday Weld - Seasons Dreamings (2010) "A Song for December"
- Têtes Raides – L'An Demain (2011) "Marteau-Piqueur", "So Free"
- Various Artists - Opera North - The Lullaby Project (2013) "Rock-a-Bye Baby"
- The Real Tuesday Weld & Friends - In Memorium (2014) "Someday"
- Opera Chaotique – Bukowski: Poems of a Dirty Old Man (2015) "As Hank Said II", "The Genius of the Crowd"
