= Shine (Crime & the City Solution album) =

Studio album by Crime & the City Solution
- Released: April 25, 1988
- Recorded: July–September 1987
- Studio: Hansa Tonstudio (Berlin, DE)
- Genre: Post-punk
- Length: 40:04
- Label: Mute
- Producer: Tony Cohen

Crime & the City Solution chronology
Room of Lights (1986)	Shine (1988)	The Bride Ship (1989)

Professional ratings
Review scores
Source	Rating
Allmusic	4/5 stars

Shine is the second studio album by Crime & the City Solution, released on April 25, 1988 through Mute Records.

== Recording ==
Recording was done at Hansa Tonstudio, near the Berlin Wall. Producer Tony Cohen said the console at the studio was "slick and clinical" and much better than he was used to using. He said, "Alex Hacke had replaced Rowland Howard. I'd listen to his guitar parts and think, 'Fuck, that is so clever'." Cohen also noted Mick Harvey's influence on the recording, saying, "Mick had everything under control, and that's him at his best."

== Accolades ==
Year	Publication	Country	Accolade	Rank
1988	Sounds	United Kingdom	"Albums of the Year"	*

== Track listing ==
No.	Title	Lyrics	Music	Length
1.	"All Must Be Love"	Bonney	Adams, Bonney, Hacke, Harvey, Stern	5:18
2.	"Fray So Slow"	Adams	Adams, Bonney, Hacke, Harvey	4:53
3.	"Angel"	Adams, Bonney	Adams, Bonney, Haas, Hacke, Harvey	6:01
4.	"On Every Train (Grain Will Bear Grain)"	Bonney	Adams, Bonney, Haas, Hacke, Harvey	5:23
5.	"Hunter"	Adams	Adams, Bonney, Hacke, Harvey, Stern	4:48
6.	"Steal to the Sea"	Bonney	Adams, Bonney, Haas, Hacke, Harvey	10:17
7.	"Home Is Far From Here"	Adams	Adams, Bonney, Hacke, Harvey, Stern	3:19

== Personnel ==
Crime & the City Solution

- Bronwyn Adams – violin
- Simon Bonney – vocals
- Chrislo Haas – guitar, keyboards
- Alexander Hacke – guitar
- Mick Harvey – drums, piano
- Thomas Stern – bass guitar

Production and additional personnel

- Tony Cohen – engineering
- Peter Gruchot – photography
