= Honeymoon in Red =

Studio album by Honeymoon in Red
- Released: 1988
- Recorded: June 1982 – July 1982 at Game Studio in Berlin-Kreuzberg, Germany; August 1982 at Cold Storage Studios in London, England
- Length: 37:11
- Label: Widowspeak
- Producer: none given

Honeymoon in Red is a concept album by a band of the same name, released in 1988, primarily written by Lydia Lunch and Rowland S. Howard. Honeymoon in Red is sometimes referred to as a band or alternately as a collaboration between Lydia Lunch and members of The Birthday Party.

== Music ==
Honeymoon in Red is musically eclectic, combining elements of burlesque, no wave, singer/songwriter Jacques Brel, American Underground, the use of a "varispeed" for atmospherics, a song by country pop songwriter Lee Hazlewood, dissonant piano and guitar and muscular bass guitar and the darkly charismatic personas of Nick Cave and Lydia Lunch.

The album generally resembles the angular pop of The Birthday Party's Prayers on Fire, although the song "Dead in the Head" recalls the strident guitar playing of Teenage Jesus and the Jerks. Unlike The Birthday Party, Honeymoon In Red emphasises vernacular speech akin to 1970s American television and film, instead of emulating the Southern Gothic literary genre. In a 1983 television interview, Lunch spoke of the experimental music as "religious music" that was "not rock".

== Artwork ==
The album's graphic design resembled a lurid 1950s Saul Bass movie poster, with cockfighting motifs. The liner notes from Lunch titled "THE TERRORTORY" comments on commercial and religious puritanical attitudes. It included an Annie Sprinkle photograph of Lunch's body superimposed onto a rural roadmap, also a photograph by Chris Stein of Lunch wearing a "suicide blonde" wig and heavy make up, holding up a large pistol.

== Fallout and release ==
Mick Harvey has stated that the project was originally conceived as a new band; a collaboration between Harvey, Lunch, Genevieve McGuckin and Rowland S. Howard. After the initial recording sessions in Berlin in June 1982, the tapes languished without a release. In 1987 Lunch readied the tapes for release on her own Widowspeak label, with added contributions by J.G. Thirlwell and Thurston Moore. Lunch had already fallen out with Nick Cave and Harvey, and they insisted that their names not appear on the release, as they had no hand in the remix and overdubbing. Lunch subsequently used pseudonyms for Cave and Harvey (including "A drunk cowboy junkie" and "Dick Strum", respectively) and obliquely criticized them in her liner notes as "tight asses" and "sheep in wolf's clothing". The album originally appeared in this reworked form but has subsequently been reissued with the mixes from the original 1982 Berlin sessions.

A 12" single of "Done Dun" (a Cave/Lunch duet) was released on side B of the Lydia Lunch/Thurston Moore/Clint Ruin single "The Crumb", and referred to The Honeymoon in Red Orchestra.

== Reception ==
Professional ratings
Review scores
Source	Rating
AllMusic	3/5 stars
Spin Alternative Record Guide	7/10
Trouser Press	mixed-to-favorable

Trouser Press called it "not a great album by any means, but of definite interest to fans of those involved."

== Track listing ==
Side A
No.	Title	Lyrics	Music	Length
1.	"Come Fall"	Rowland S. Howard	Rowland S. Howard	4:54
2.	"So Your Heart"	Lydia Lunch	Thurston Moore, Clint Ruin	2:20
3.	"Dead River"	Lydia Lunch	Mick Harvey	2:40
4.	"Three Kings"	Genevieve McGuckin	Genevieve McGuckin	7:26

Side B
No.	Title	Lyrics	Music	Length
1.	"Done Dun"	Lydia Lunch	Murray Mitchell	4:28
2.	"Still Burning"	Rowland S. Howard	Rowland S. Howard	5:32
3.	"Fields of Fire"	Lydia Lunch	Rowland S. Howard	3:54
4.	"Dead in the Head"	Lydia Lunch	Rowland S. Howard	5:57

== Personnel ==
1982 session

- Lydia Lunch – vocals
- Rowland S. Howard – guitar, vocals
- Genevieve McGuckin – piano, organ
- Murray Mitchell – guitar
- Tracy Pew – bass
- Nick Cave – vocals (credited only as "Her dead twin" and "A drunk cowboy junkie")
- Mick Harvey – drums, piano (credited only as "Anonymous", "Scatman Cramden", "Howie Dewitt", "Dick Strum", "Ralf Bellow", "Spencer Turk", and "Frank Leer")
- Steve Montgomery – mix

1987 remix session

- Thurston Moore – guitar
- J.G. Thirlwell AKA Clint Ruin – mix
- Martin Bisi – mix

Bonus track "Some Velvet Morning"

- Lydia Lunch – vocal
- Rowland S. Howard – vocal, guitar
- Genevieve McGuckin – piano
- Barry Adamson – bass
- Mick Harvey – drums
- Peter Williams – engineer
