= Dimitris Papaspyropoulos =

Greek musician

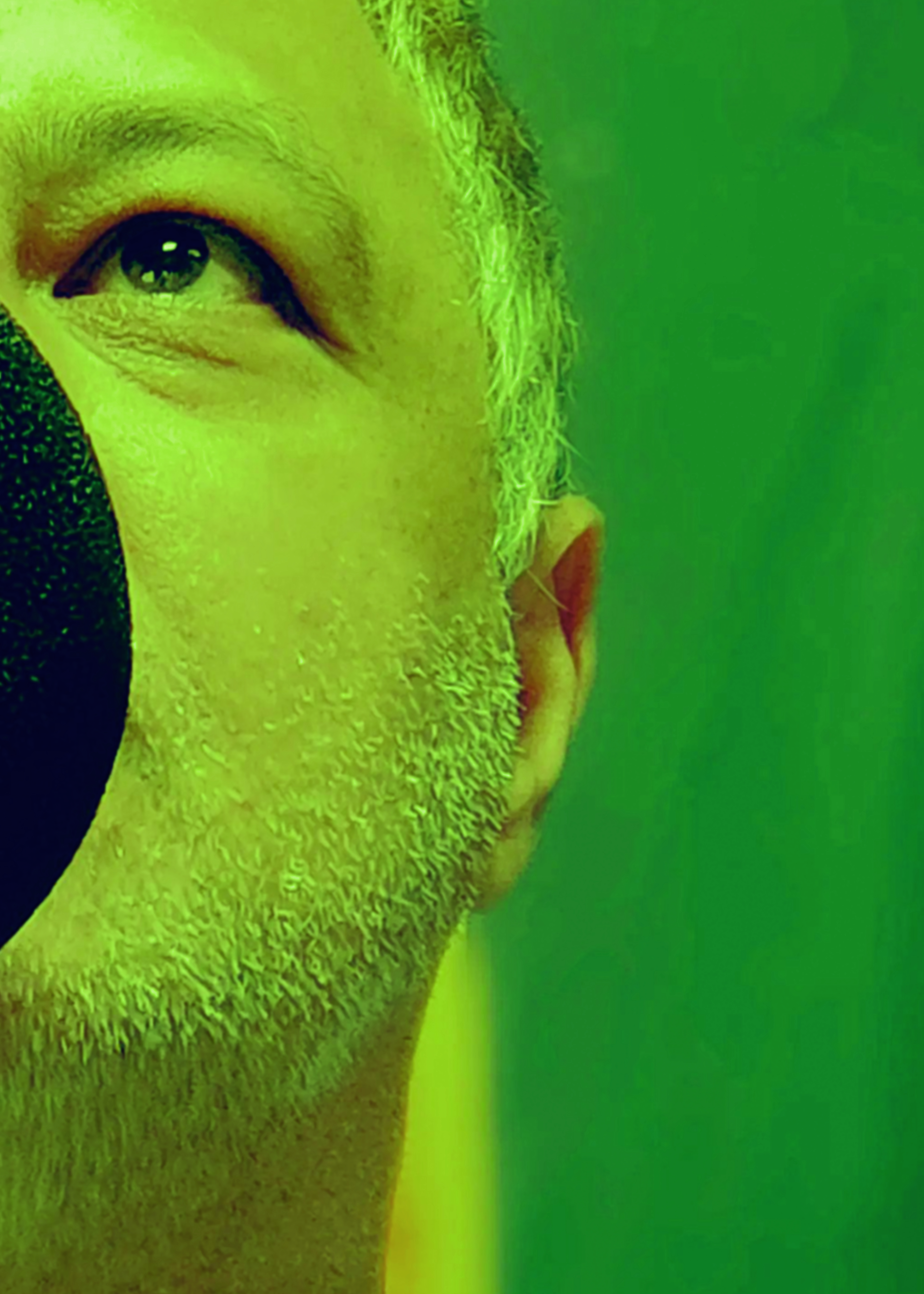
Papaspyropoulos in 2013

Dimitris Papaspyropoulos (Greek: Δημήτρης Παπασπυρόπουλος) is a Greek musician. He studied mathematics at the National and Kapodistrian University of Athens. He is a Greek DJ, radio producer, music curator, composer, and remixer. He is widely recognized for his work in alternative and electronic music, his radio shows, compilation albums, remixes and original productions.. He works under the artistic name Last Chance, under which he signs all his music productions and DJ sets.

== DJing ==
Papaspyropoulos is an active DJ, performing since the mid-1980s in clubs, venues, and special events. He has performed at major parties and music festivals in Greece, as well as internationally in Denmark, Iceland, and the United Kingdom.

== Radio ==
As a radio producer, Papaspyropoulos has been active since 1996, creating and presenting music-focused radio programs. Over the course of his career, he has conducted interviews with well-known Greek and international artists and has curated extensive music tributes and thematic broadcasts, which have been documented and archived as part of his radio work. Through his radio programs, numerous songs were introduced to Greek audiences and subsequently gained wider recognition. Editorial independence in music selection is a defining aspect of his work, allowing him to program across a wide range of musical genres and decades without stylistic or chronological restrictions. He joined Klik FM in 1996 and moved to Best Radio 92.6 in 2001, where he continues to host his daily music program.

== Compilations and music production ==
Between 1999 and 2014, Papaspyropoulos curated twelve compilation albums, several of which became bestsellers.

Papaspyropoulos's compilations have been described in music press coverage as a reflection of personal and collective emotional states.

== Original music and remixes ==
Releasing music under the name Last Chance, Papaspyropoulos has collaborated with vocalists including Craig Walker, Antony Reynolds, Liam McKahey, Jessica Bell, Dioni, and others. His remix of Peter Gabriel's "Games Without Frontiers" was selected by Real World Studios among the top five in a global competition in 2010.

Papaspyropoulos has also remixed songs by Archive, Keep Shelly in Athens, Kid Moxie, Slovo, and numerous Greek artists.

== Theater and other work ==
In 2010, Papaspyropoulos was the music supervisor for Jean Anouilh's Medea, staged at Altera Pars Theater in Athens.

== Compilations ==
- Electro Kodes (1999)
- Boarding Pass (2001)
- Travelling Light (2002)
- The Strength of Whispers (2003)
- Blessed and Cursed (2004)
- Once Upon a Time (2005)
- One Dream Closer (2006)
- Silent Wonder (2007)
- Before the Summer Came (2008)
- Turning Point (2009)
- Long Missed Heroes (2010)
- Farewell, Kid! (2014)

== Singles and EPs ==
- "Heaven" (feat. Craig Walker, 2009)
- "Life's Too Long" (feat. Antony Reynolds, 2013)
- "The Midget" (feat. Craig Walker, 2013)
- "22:46" (feat. Tolis Fasois, 2014)
- "The Skin Of Dreams" (feat. Antony Reynolds, 2016)
- "Junk as I Am" (feat. Craig Walker, 2017)
- "Forsaken (Part I)" (feat. Dioni, 2019)
- "The Child I Never Was" (feat. One of Vas, 2021)
- "Unleashed!" (feat. Brian Dalton, 2021)
- "Here Comes the Silence" (2021)
- "Stellar Exile" (2022)
  Dimitris Papaspyropoulos
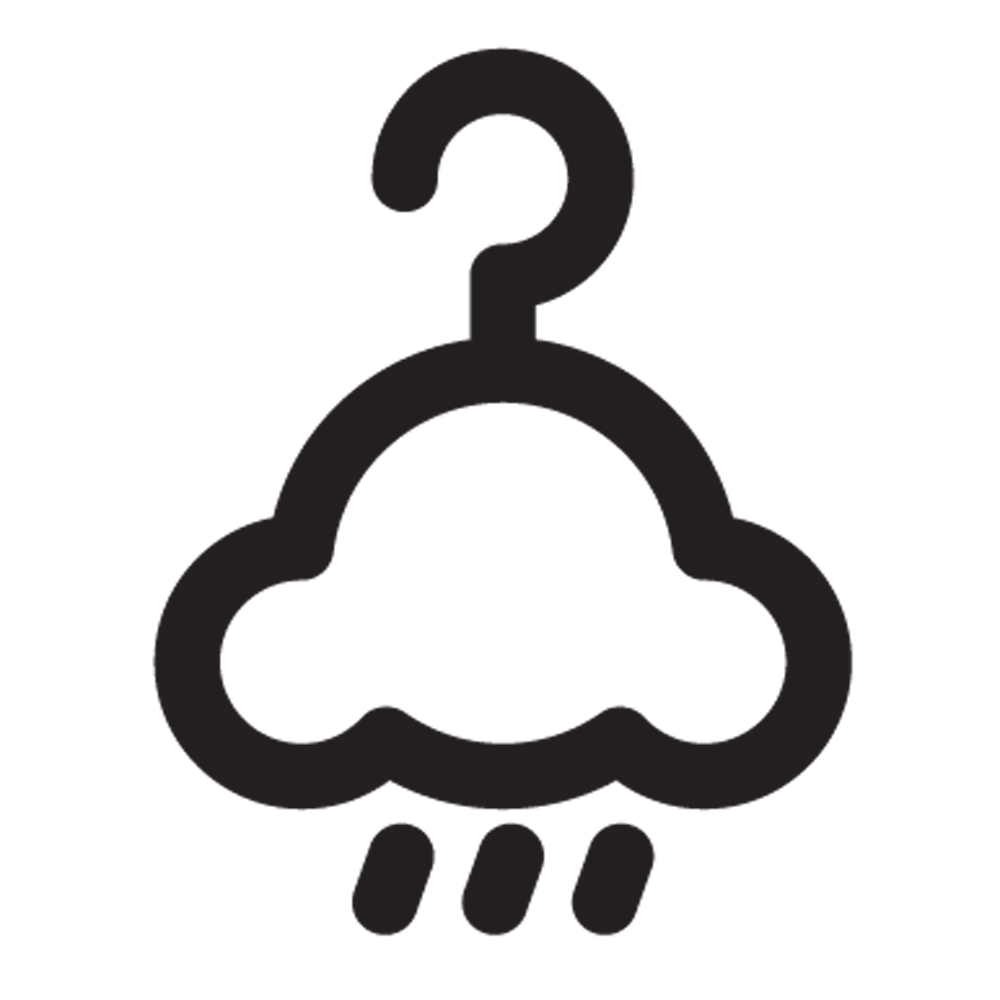
  Background information
  - Born: Athens, Greece
  - Origin: Athens, Greece
  - Genres: Indietronic, Darkwave, Synthpop, Post-Punk, Alternative
  - Occupations: DJ, radio producer, composer, remixer, music curator
  - Years active: 1985–present
  - Label: Last Chance Music
  - Website: lastchancemusic.gr
- "Lament" (feat. Joanna Michaelidou, 2022)
- "Branded With Fear" (2023)
- "Goodbye Horses" (feat. Denis Casmas, 2024)
- "The Well & The Water" (feat. Liam McKahey, 2024)
- "To the Skies" (2024)
- "The Promise" (feat. One of Vas, 2024)
- "Why'd I Have to Fall in Love with You" (feat. George Priniotakis, 2024)
- "Duel" (feat. Alexandros Raptis, 2024)
- "Neon Dream" (feat. Joanna Michaelidou, 2025)
- "Don't Fall for the Chain" (feat. Jessica Bell, 2025)
- "Photographic" (feat. Alexandros Raptis, 2025)
- "Frozen Star" (feat. Jessica Bell, 2025)
- "Under Spell" (feat. Jessica Bell, 2025)
- "Ten Sec Life" (feat. Jennie Nega, 2026)

== Remixes ==
- Maria Papadopoulou – "En Vytho H Alethia" (2001)
- Slovo feat. Kirsty Hawkshaw – "Whisper" (2003)
- Transistor – "Living" (2004)
- Nikko Patrelakis – "Lonely Winter" (2004)
- Atria – "Kiss You" (2004)
- Astyplaz – "Spreading Life" (2004)
- Slovo – "Spun Out" (2005)
- Fadeout – "I Don't Care" (2005)
- Film – "Alarm" (2006)
- Home Video – "Sleep Sweet" (2007)
- Peter Gabriel – "Games Without Frontiers" (2010)
- Cyanna – "I Am Cannibal" (2012)
- Saso – "Billion Hands" (2012)
- Mineral – "Love Divine" (2013)
- Nsquared – "Rumours Of War" (2013)
- Archive – "Stick Me In My Heart" (2013)
- Keep Shelly In Athens – "Silent Rain" (2015)
- Dreamachinery – "Maurice X Song" (2015)
- Archive – "Distorted Angels" (2015)
- The Black Capes – "Wolfchild" (2018)
- Archive – "Erase" (2019)
- Common Sence – "Grotesque" (2020)
- Jennie Nega – "Don't Know If It's Forever" (2020)
- Lego Boy & Beat Ride – "Love Is Not My Style" (2020)
- Katsou feat. D. Manwlas – "Dark is Me" (2021)
- Kid Moxie – "Better Than Electric" (2021)
- Dream Sequence – "Outside Looking In" (2023)
