= Rowland S. Howard =

Australian musician and songwriter (1959–2009)

- Howard in 2009

Background information
- Born: Rowland Stuart Howard; 24 October 1959; Melbourne, Victoria, Australia
- Died: 30 December 2009 (aged 50); Heidelberg, Victoria, Australia
- Genres: Post-punk; punk blues; indie rock
- Occupations: Musician, songwriter
- Instruments: Guitar, organ, vocals
- Years active: 1975–2009
- Formerly of: The Birthday Party, The Boys Next Door, Crime & the City Solution, These Immortal Souls

Rowland Stuart Howard (24 October 1959 – 30 December 2009) was an Australian rock musician, guitarist and songwriter, best known for his work with the post-punk group The Birthday Party and his subsequent solo career.

== Early life ==
Rowland Stuart Howard was born on 24 October 1959 in Melbourne, to John Stanton Howard and Lorraine (née Stuart), the second of three children. His siblings were sister Angela Howard and brother Harry Howard, both also musicians. In a 2016 interview, his brother Harry Howard stated the family is of paternal English descent from Bolton, Lancashire and maternal Scottish descent.

== Career ==
=== 1978–1990 ===
Rowland Stuart Howard wrote "Shivers" at the age of 16 while in the band Young Charlatans. Howard gained acclaim after joining Melbourne-based band The Boys Next Door, when the song was released as a single. The band changed their name to The Birthday Party and Howard's discordant guitar remained a major factor in their sound. The Birthday Party relocated from Australia to London in 1980 and subsequently to West Berlin.

The Birthday Party's early records were released by Missing Link Records in Australia and 4AD Records in the UK. They later became associated with Mute Records in Europe. Howard was also a member of the short-lived project, Tuff Monks with Birthday Party bandmates, Nick Cave and Mick Harvey. However, Howard and singer Nick Cave suffered 'creative differences', and Howard left the Birthday Party as they transformed into The Bad Seeds. He soon became a member of Crime & the City Solution, a band led by Simon Bonney. Howard, with Crime & the City Solution, appeared in the 1987 movie Wings of Desire by German filmmaker Wim Wenders playing the song "Six Bells Chime" in a Berlin Club. Later he formed These Immortal Souls with girlfriend Genevieve McGuckin, brother, Harry Howard, and Epic Soundtracks.

Howard also collaborated with Lydia Lunch, Nikki Sudden, ex-Barracudas singer Jeremy Gluck, guitarist Gavin Poolman, French electro group KaS Product, Barry Adamson, Einstürzende Neubauten, guitarist Chris Haskett, The Gun Club singer and songwriter Jeffrey Lee Pierce, Fad Gadget, Nick Cave and the Bad Seeds, Henry Rollins, and A.C. Marias.

Lydia Lunch and Thurston Moore recorded a version of Howard's song "Still Burning" for Lunch's In Limbo (1984). "Still Burning" had previously been recorded as a bass-heavy track with Howard on vocals, during the Honeymoon In Red recording sessions (1983–1987).

These Immortal Souls released their first album Get Lost, (Don't Lie!) in 1987 and played shows in Europe and America, returning to Australia for a short tour in 1988.

=== 1990–1999 ===
After the release of These Immortal Souls' second album, I'm Never Gonna Die Again, (1992) and another Howard/Lunch collaboration Shotgun Wedding, Howard, Lunch and members of The Beasts Of Bourbon performed live on tour in Australia and Europe with guitarist Link Benka. Shotgun Wedding was re-released with a second compact disc of live recordings. Shotgun Wedding featured cover versions of "In My Time of Dying" and Alice Cooper's "Black Juju". Recorded in Memphis with Link Benka (rhythm guitar), Joseph -Joe- Drake (bass) and Brent Newman (aka Glyn Styler) (drums).

Howard sang backing vocals on the Nick Cave and the Bad Seeds album Let Love In (1994). In 1995 These Immortal Souls contributed their version of "You Can't Unring a Bell" to a Tom Waits tribute album Step Right Up.

He left London to return to Melbourne in 1995.

Paul Godfrey a.k.a. Epic Soundtracks, the UK drummer for These Immortal Souls, was found dead in his London apartment on 5 November 1997. These Immortal Souls played their last show, at the Greyhound Hotel in St Kilda, with Lydia Lunch in 1998.

Howard lamented in a 1999 television interview (Studio 22, ABCTV) with Clinton Walker that people still asked him about "Shivers", a song he wrote when he was sixteen years old which first became well known when it was sung by Nick Cave.

Howard released a solo album called Teenage Snuff Film in Australia in 1999. He was backed by Mick Harvey on drums, and Brian Hooper on bass.

=== 2000–2009 ===
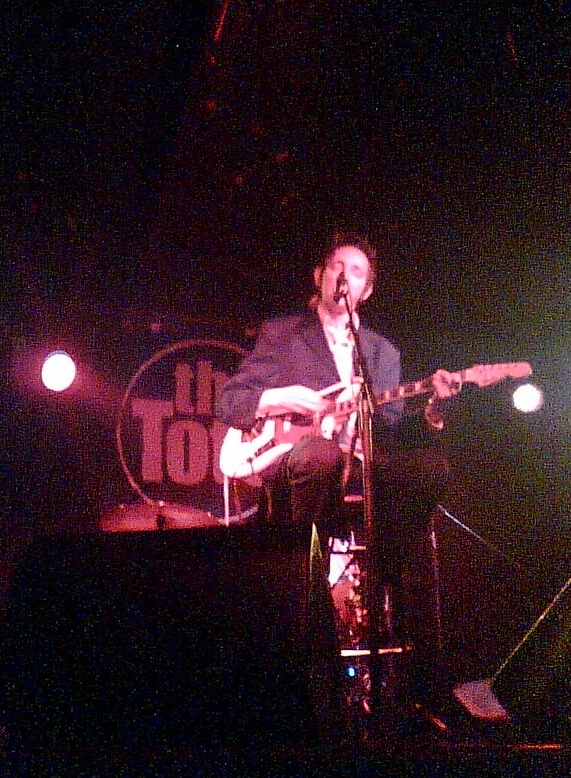
Howard performing at The Tote, Melbourne, 2007

An unofficial Rowland S. Howard fan website was established as the amount of Rowland S. Howard related information and file swapping grew steadily on the internet from the mid-1990s.

Howard made a cameo appearance in the 2002 vampire movie Queen of the Damned as a musician in a vampire club band.

In August 2005, Howard performed at the premiere party for Scott Crary's film Kill Your Idols in Melbourne, Australia, along with the band HTRK.

French label Stagger Records released a double CD tribute album to Howard in 2007 featuring Mick Harvey, The Drones, The Holy Soul, Penny Ikinger, Loene Carmen, Nikki Sudden, Noah Taylor and many more.

In September 2007, Howard joined with Magic Dirt and Beasts of Bourbon for a tour of the east coast of Australia. Howard appeared at the All Tomorrows Parties rock festival in Australia in January 2009, curated by Nick Cave and the Bad Seeds. He was backed by Mick Harvey on drums, and JP Shilo on bass. Howard's second solo album, Pop Crimes, was released in October 2009 to acclaim from the musician Robert Forster. He appeared on the Magic Dirt EP White Boy playing guitar and supplying vocals on the track "Summer High".

== Illness and death ==
Howard suffered from chronic Hepatitis C virus and had been told in 2003, when he was 44, that his liver was stricken with end-stage cirrhosis. Doctors compared it to the liver of a 74-year-old alcoholic. In an October 2009 interview, Howard said that the forthcoming album he was working on (Pop Crimes) was recorded quickly: "I contracted liver disease a while back and I've basically got liver cancer, I'm waiting for a transplant, if I don't get it things might not go so well...so..." . He died of hepatocellular carcinoma secondary to liver cirrhosis on 30 December 2009. Howard was 50 years old. His funeral was held at Sacred Heart Church, St Kilda, Melbourne on 7 January 2010.

His Birthday Party bandmates reflected upon his death: Nick Cave told WENN, "This is very sad news. Rowland was Australia's most unique, gifted and uncompromising guitarist. He was also a good friend. He will be missed by many". Mick Harvey remarked, "Sometimes people are ready to go because they have been sick for a long time, but Rowland really wanted to live. Things were going well for him outside his health and he wanted to take advantage of that, and he was very disappointed that he wasn't well enough to do so".

== Legacy ==
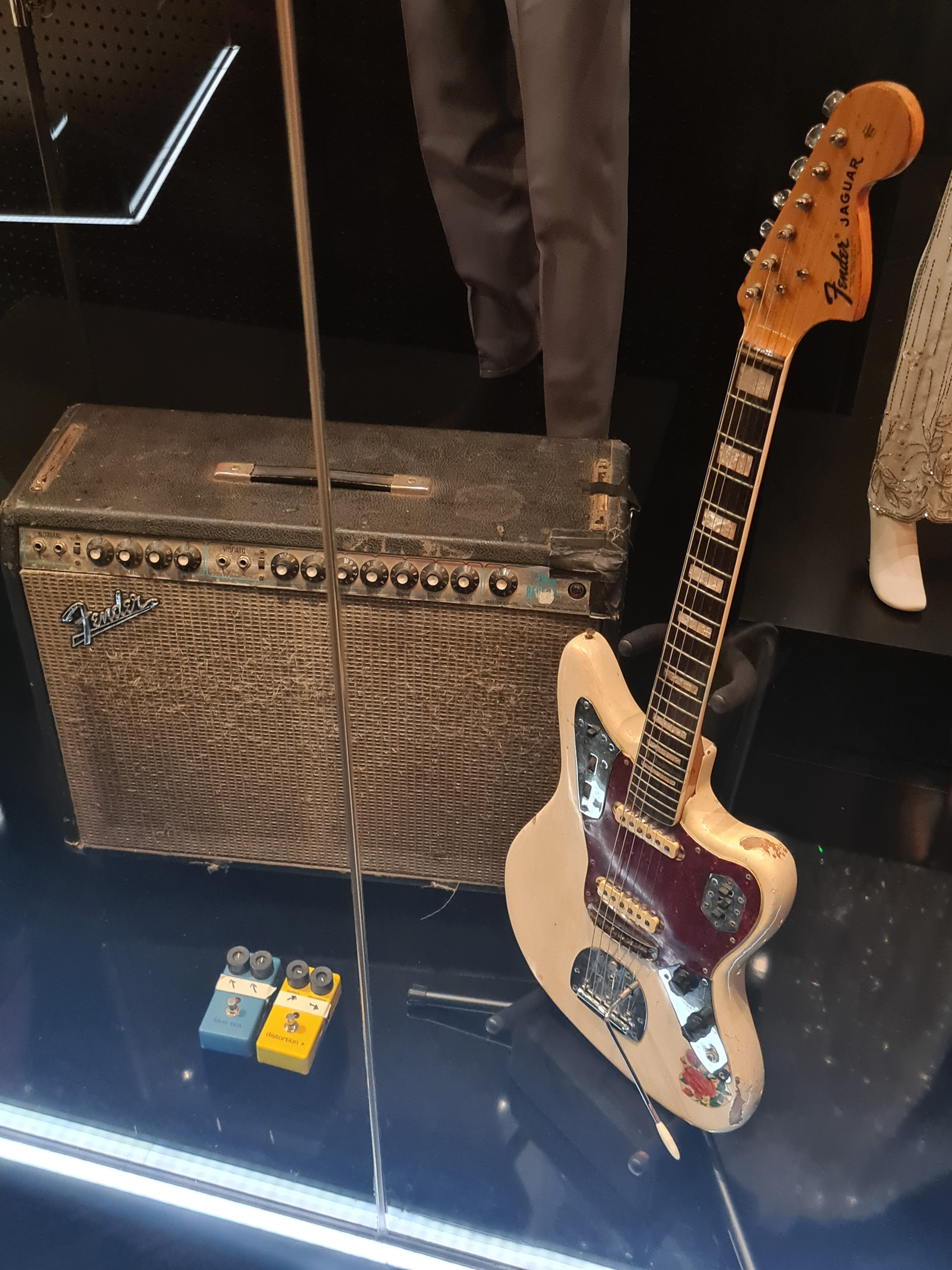
Howard's Fender Jaguar and amplifier, Australian Music Vault, Melbourne

In October 2011, filmmaker Richard Lowenstein (Dogs in Space) and Lynn-Maree Milburn (We're Living on Dogfood – documentary maker), released a 110-minute documentary film on the life of Rowland S. Howard titled Autoluminescent: Rowland S. Howard which had a limited release for cinema. On 24 April 2013, Port Phillip Council approved a proposal to name a St Kilda laneway Rowland S. Howard Lane to honour Howard's contribution to the St Kilda music scene. Pop Crimes: The Songs of Rowland S. Howard, an occasional band composed of Rowland's friends and bandmates began performing in 2013; they toured Europe in February 2020. In June 2020, Yves Saint Laurent used his song 'Shut Me Down' for an advertisement campaign.

The Australian author Kirsten Krauth titled her 2020 novel Almost a Mirror, a quote from Howard's iconic early song Shivers. The novel has at its core the world of St Kilda's Crystal Ballroom in the 1980s, a venue in which Howard, Cave et al cut their performing teeth.

== Discography ==
=== Albums ===
List of albums, with selected chart positions
Title	Album details	Peak chart positions
Title	Album details	AUS
I Knew Buffalo Bill (Jeremy Gluck with Nikki Sudden & Rowland S. Howard)	Released: 1987; Label: Flicknife Records (SHARP 037); Format: LP, CS, CD	—
Kiss You Kidnapped Charabanc (with Nikki Sudden)	Released: October 1987; Label: Creation Records (CRELP 022); Format: LP, CS, CD	—
Honeymoon in Red (with Lydia Lunch, Genevieve McGuckin, Tracy Pew & Thurston Moore)	Released: 1988; Label: Widowspeak Productions (WSP 12); Format: LP, CS	—
Shotgun Wedding (with Lydia Lunch)	Released: May 1991; Label: Triple X, UFO (UFOWSP2LP); Format: LP, CS, CD	—
Teenage Snuff Film	Released: 1999; Label: Reliant Records (NC17-0002); Format: CD	74
Pop Crimes	Released: October 2009; Label: Liberation Music (LMCD0088); Format: LP, CD, digital	—
Six Strings That Drew Blood	Released: December 2014; Label: Liberation Music (LMCD0255); Format: 4×LP, 2×CD, digital; Note: Compilation album	—
Siberia (with Lydia Lunch)	Released: 2017; Label: Bang! Records (Bang!-LP116); Format: LP; Note: recorded live in 1993	—
Johnny Smiled Slowly (with Nikki Sudden)	Released: 2017; Label: Bang! Records (Bang!-LP119); Format: LP; Note: recorded live in 1987	—

== Bibliography ==
=== Publications about Rowland S Howard ===
- A Day in the Life of Rowland S. Howard by Peter Milne. M.33, Australia (2015)
- Ephemerality is All Very Well by Tony Clark and Lyndal Walker. M.33, Australia (2019)
- This Guitar Belongs to Rowland S. Howard by Harry Howard and Linsey Gosper (2021)
- Still Burning by Keiko Yoshida and Danny Flynn. London (2023)

== See also ==
- Crime & the City Solution
- The Birthday Party (band)
- These Immortal Souls

== Awards ==
=== AIR Awards ===
The Australian Independent Record Awards (commonly known informally as AIR Awards) is an annual awards night to recognise, promote and celebrate the success of Australia's Independent Music sector.

Year	Nominee / work	Award	Result	Ref.
2010	Pop Crimes	Best Independent Album	Nominated	
