= Simon Bonney =

Australian country rock musician

- Born: Simon Philip Bonney; 1961 (age 64–65); Sydney, New South Wales, Australia
- Genre: Country rock
- Occupation: Singer-songwriter
- Instrument: Vocals
- Years active: 1976–present
- Label: Mute

Simon Philip Bonney (born 1961) is an Australian country rock musician. He formed Crime & the City Solution in late 1977 as a post punk group and an outlet for his song writing. The band has had different line-ups throughout their history, with Bonney as the only mainstay. Bronwyn Adams joined in 1986 on violin and backing vocals – the pair later married. Incarnations of Crime & the City Solution have existed in Sydney, Melbourne, London, Berlin and Detroit. When Crime & the City Solution split up in the early 1990s Bonney and Adams relocated to the United States where he released two solo albums, Forever (1992) and Everyman (1996). Crime & the City Solution reformed in 2012.

== Biography ==
Simon Philip Bonney was born in 1961. In 1977 he supplied lead vocals for Sydney-based group, the Particles alongside Don McLennan, Mick Smith, Peter Williams and Steve Williams. Later that year he formed a post punk band, Crime & the City Solution, with Mclennan on drums, Phil Kitchener on bass guitar, Dave MacKinnon on saxophone and Harry Zantey on guitar. The group relocated to Melbourne, London and then Berlin with varied line-ups centred on Bonney. Late in 1986 Bronwyn Adams joined on violin and backing vocals; Bonney and Adams became domestic partners and later married. By 1991 the group had issued four studio albums, Room of Lights (1986), Shine (1988), The Bride Ship (1989) and Paradise Discotheque (1990).

By the early 1990s Bonney and Adams relocated to Los Angeles, when, according to Richie Unterberger of AllMusic, his sound was "much rootsier, less gothic angst-infused" compared with Crime & the City Solution. Bonney's solo albums were influenced by Americana with his debut album, Forever, released in 1992. AllMusic's Ned Raggett felt Bonney "creates a mystic, almost mythic atmosphere" on the album, which "conjures up the feeling of a West that never was, where hoe-downs and wild dances are replaced by contemplation, lyrically and musically."

Bonney's second album Everyman (1995) continued his experimentations with country music and was partly recorded in Austin. Unterberger found it was "a subdued affair that sounds much more American than Australian, with its reflection of rural Americana. The careful, acoustic-oriented arrangements." A proposed third solo album was recorded in Detroit, Michigan, in the late 1990s, but remains unreleased. One track "Eyes of Blue" was placed on YouTube in February 2009. Bonney released three of the tracks on his Myspace account: "Annabelle-Lee", "Eyes of Blue" and "Can't Believe Anymore" in February 2010. Two other unreleased tracks, "Lonely Stars" and "The Water's Edge", were also posted on that account. The latter tracks were used on the soundtrack of the 1996 feature film, Underworld. Several tracks from Eyes of Blue were included on the 2018 compilation Past, Present, Future. Bonney largely retired from the music in the mid-90s, working in various jobs and eventually attending university. He currently manages aid programs for non-profits and lives in Thailand.

Bonney plays with various Detroit musicians, from bands such as the Lonely Stars, Outrageous Cherry, and The Volebeats. Crime & the City Solution re-formed in 2012 in Detroit and released a new album, American Twilight (March 2013).

== Solo discography ==
=== Studio albums ===
- Forever (Mute Records; 1992)
- Everyman (Mute Records; 1995)

=== Compilations ===
- Past, Present, Future (Mute Records; 2019)

=== Music video ===
- "Don't Walk Away From Love" (1995) Directed by Dani Jacobs
