= Harry Howard (musician) =

Australian musician

Harry Howard is an Australian musician who played bass guitar in Crime & the City Solution and These Immortal Souls both also featuring his older brother, Rowland S. Howard. He then played guitar in Pink Stainless Tail for several years.

Howard now fronts his own band Harry Howard and the NDE where he sings his own songs and plays guitar. The band also includes Edwina Preston on backing vocals, Acetone organ and Stylophone, Clare Moore on drums and Dave Graney on bass guitar. They have played extensively in and around Melbourne since 2011. The band have also done two European tours and released three LPs Near Death Experience; Pretty and Sleepless Girls on Spooky Records, Melbourne, Crane Records France and Beast Records, France.

Howard has been involved in another project "ATOM" with Edwina Preston and Ben Hepworth, affiliated with It Records, Melbourne; ATOM's first LP, In Every Dream Home was released in early 2020.

Harry Howard and Edwina Preston also play together as "Duet". "Duet" plan to release an LP of original songs and covers in 2019.

== Discography ==
=== Harry Howard and the NDE ===
- Near Death Experience, 2012
- Pretty, 2013
- Sleepless Girls, 2016
