= The Birthday Party discography =

- Studio albums: 4
- EPs: 6
- Live albums: 2
- Compilation albums: 5
- Singles: 9
- Video albums: 1
- Music videos: 2
- Box sets: 1
- Other appearances: 16

The discography of The Birthday Party, an Australian post-punk band, consists of four studio albums, two live albums, six compilation albums, six extended plays and nine singles. The group began under various names in Melbourne in 1973; formed by vocalist Nick Cave, guitarist Mick Harvey, drummer Phill Calvert, guitarist John Cocivera, bassist Brett Purcell, and saxophonist Chris Coyne —all of whom were students at Caulfield Grammar School. By 1978, following several membership changes, the band consisted of Cave, Harvey and Calvert with bassist Tracy Pew and guitarist Rowland S Howard. Under the name The Boys Next Door, the band released several singles and two studio albums, Door, Door in 1979 on Mushroom Records and The Birthday Party in 1980 on Missing Link Records.

Despite moderate success in Australia, The Boys Next Door relocated to London, England in 1980 and changed their name to The Birthday Party. In London, the band experienced underground critical success with a series of singles and two further studio albums, Prayers on Fire (1981) and Junkyard (1982); Junkyard was also a minor commercial success, peaking at number 72 on the UK Albums Chart upon its release. In 1982, the band relocated to West Berlin, Germany and Calvert departed. The band, now featuring Harvey on dual guitar and drumming duties, released as two EPs, The Bad Seed and Mutiny!, in 1983 on 4AD and Mute Records. Featuring Einstürzende Neubauten member Blixa Bargeld as a guest musician, they were the band's final recordings prior to their disbandment in late 1983.

Cave, Harvey, Barry Adamson and Bargeld formed Nick Cave and the Bad Seeds in December 1983 and Howard joined Crime and the City Solution, as well as forming These Immortal Souls in the wake of The Birthday Party's break-up. The band's back catalogue has been reissued several times, usually in the form of compilation albums such as Mutiny/The Bad Seed (1989) and Hits (1992), and several unreleased recordings and video albums have been released since their disbandment. Though the band did not experience commercial success during their career, they have been recognised as having a major impact on the gothic rock genre and influencing several subsequent bands, including My Bloody Valentine, Gogol Bordello and LCD Soundsystem.

== Albums ==
=== Studio albums ===
List of studio albums, with chart positions
Title	Album details	Peak chart positions		
Title	Album details	AUS	UK	UK Indie
Door, Door	Released: 1979 (AUS) (Note: Door, Door was released under The Boys Next Door. Some reissues do not alter the band's name on the release; others, including the 2011 Mushroom LP repressing, omit it from the album's sleeve.); Labels: Mushroom (36931); Formats: LP, CD	93	—	—
The Birthday Party	Released: November 1980 (AUS) (Note: The Birthday Party was originally released under The Boys Next Door. The only repressing of the album from 1982 changed the band's name to The Birthday Party.); Labels: Missing Link (7); Formats: LP	—	—	—
Prayers on Fire	Released: 6 April 1981 (UK); Labels: Missing Link (14), 4AD (104); Formats: LP, CD	96	—	4
Junkyard	Released: 10 July 1982(UK); Labels: Missing Link (21), 4AD (207); Formats: LP, CD	—	72	1
"—" denotes a release that did not chart

=== Live albums ===
List of live albums, with chart positions
Title	Album details	Peak chart positions
Title	Album details	UK Indie
It's Still Living	Released: May 1985 (AUS); Labels: Missing Link (009), Virgin (2048); Formats: LP, CD	19
Live 1981–82	Released: 10 August 1999 (UK); Labels: 4AD (9005); Formats: 2×LP, CD	—
"—" denotes a release that did not chart

=== Compilation albums ===
List of compilation albums
Title	Album details
A Collection…	Released: 1985 (AUS); Labels: Missing Link (22), Suite Beat (2017); Formats: LP, CD
Hee-Haw	Released: 1988 (UK); Labels: 4AD (307), Virgin (2037); Formats: LP, CD
Mutiny/The Bad Seed	Released: 1989 (UK); Labels: 4AD (301)
Hits	Released: 12 October 1992 (UK); Labels: 4AD (2016), Warner Bros (9 45087); Formats: 2×LP, CD, CS
The John Peel Sessions	Released: 28 May 2001 (UK); Labels: Strange Fruit (098); Formats: 2×LP, CD

== Box sets ==
List of box sets
Title	Album details
Definitive Missing Link Recordings 1979–1982	Released: 1994 (AUS); Labels: Missing Link (30); Formats: 5×CD box set

== Extended plays ==
List of extended plays, with chart positions
Title	Album details	Peak chart positions
Title	Album details	UK Indie
Hee-Haw	Released: December 1979 (AUS) (Note: Hee-Haw was originally released under The Boys Next Door. The only repressing of the EP from 1983 changed the band's name to The Birthday Party.); Labels: Missing Link (3); Formats: 12"	—
Drunk on the Pope's Blood/The Agony Is the Ecstacy (The Birthday Party/Lydia Lunch)	Released: 18 February 1982 (UK); Labels: 4AD (202), Missing Link (006); Formats: 12", CS	2
The Bad Seed	Released: March 1983 (UK); Labels: 4AD (301); Formats: 12"	3
Mutiny!	Released: November 1983 (UK); Labels: Mute (12 29); Formats: 12"	3
The Peel Sessions	Released: January 1987 (UK); Labels: Strange Fruit (020); Formats: 12", CD	7
The Peel Sessions II	Released: November 1988 (UK); Labels: Strange Fruit (058); Formats: 12", CD	11
"—" denotes a release that did not chart

== Singles ==
=== Retail singles ===
List of retail singles, with chart positions
Single	Year	Peak chart positions	Album	Notes
Single	Year	UK Indie	Album	Notes
"These Boots Are Made for Walking"	1978	—	Non-LP single	Released under The Boys Next Door, backed with non-LP track "Boy Hero"
"Shivers"	1979	—	Door, Door	Released under The Boys Next Door
"Happy Birthday"	1980	—	The Birthday Party	Released under The Boys Next Door
"The Friend Catcher"	1980	21	The Birthday Party	N/A
"Mr. Clarinet"	1980	18	The Birthday Party	N/A
"Nick the Stripper"	1981	—	Prayers on Fire	12" backed with non-LP tracks "Blundertown" and "Kathy's Kisses"
"Release the Bats"	1981	3	Non-LP single	Backed with non-LP "Blast Off"
"Dead Joe"	1982	—	Junkyard	N/A
"—" denotes a release that did not chart

=== Split singles ===
List of split singles, with other artist
Single	Year	Other artist	Notes
"Scatterbrain"/"Early Morning Brain"	1979	Models	Released under The Boys Next Door, non-LP track

== Demos ==
List of appearances on various artist compilation albums
Song	Year	Album	Notes	Ref
"Figure of Fun"	1980	Fast Forward No 2	Released exclusively and issued free with Fast Forward magazine	
"Sex Crimes"	2005	Inner City Sound	Exclusively released on this compilation, unreleased song	

== Music videos ==
List of music videos, with directors
Title	Year	Director	Ref
"Nick the Stripper"	1981	Paul Goldman	
"Deep in the Woods"	1983	Glenn Auchinachie	

== Video releases ==
List of video albums
Title	Album details
Pleasure Heads Must Burn	Released: 1984 (UK); Labels: Ikon (7), Cherry Red (20); Formats: VHS, DVD
