= Live 1981–82 =

Live album by The Birthday Party
- Released: 10 August 1999
- Recorded: List of dates: 26 November 1981 (London); 01 July 1982 (Bremen); 17 September 1982 (Athens)
- Venues: List of venues: The Venue, London (tracks 1-10); Aladin, Bremen (tracks 11-16); Sporting, Athens (track 17)
- Genres: Post-punk; noise rock; no wave
- Length: 73:53
- Label: 4AD

The Birthday Party chronology
It's Still Living (1982)	Live 1981–82 (1999)

Professional ratings
Review scores
Source	Rating
Allmusic	4/5 stars
Encyclopedia of Popular Music	4/5 stars
The New Rolling Stone Album Guide	3/5 stars
NME	3.5/5 stars
Ox-Fanzine	4.5/5 stars
Record Collector	4/5 stars
Release Magazine	8/10 stars
The Stranger	2/5 stars

Live 1981–82 is a live album by The Birthday Party and released in August 1999. The performances were "[c]ulled from the private collection of founding member Mick Harvey with assistance from super fan Henry Rollins".

== Reception ==
The album received very positive reviews from various sources. "Though various live releases had emerged over the course of the band's existence," writes Ned Raggett for Allmusic, "no full-length capturing of the Party's particular bacchanalia approved by the group had officially emerged until this release [...][The album] threatens at all points to leap from the speakers and throttle innocent bystanders." Tim Peacock of Record Collector called it "a vital addendum to the pioneering Aussies’ oeuvre." Matt Mernagh of Exclaim! writes: "the only live album from these Australian bastards is a brilliant effort in capturing pure chaos. Whether it’s Nick Cave’s howls and murderous screams, Harvey’s squalor of blues guitar playing, Rowland S. Howard’s high pitched guitar riffs, Tracy Pew’s thumping bass being buried in the background and Phil Calvert’s hammering drum sound, this beast finds the band at their peak. [...] By performing so well together, the frenzied noise has been planned, although it doesn’t seem like that could be humanly possible." He notes the audience response as being "enthused and stunned at the same time." He finds the only downside of the album to be the fact that it "has been taken from three different locations and melded into one piece of music" instead of being from a single live show. The sound quality of the performances received praise, as did the band's cover of "Fun House", the latter of which has been described as "viciously maul[ed] and deface[ed] [in comparison to the original]" and a "relentless eight-minute thrash [...] with Jim ‘Foetus’ Thirlwell riding shotgun on sax that provides a suitably Bacchanalian climax."

== Track listing ==
Live 1981–82
No.	Title	Writer(s)	Original release	Length
1.	"Junkyard"	Nick Cave, Rowland S. Howard	Junkyard (1982)	6:26
2.	"A Dead Song"	Cave, Anita Lane	Prayers on Fire (1981)	2:41
3.	"The Dim Locator"	Howard	Junkyard	3:09
4.	"Zoo-Music Girl"	Cave, Howard	Prayers on Fire	3:05
5.	"Nick the Stripper"	Cave	Prayers on Fire	4:08
6.	"Blast Off"	Howard	Junkyard	2:39
7.	"Release the Bats"	Cave, Mick Harvey	Junkyard	3:05
8.	"Bully Bones"	Howard		3:04
9.	"King Ink"	Cave, Howard	Prayers on Fire	5:53
10.	"Pleasure Heads Must Burn"	Cave	Drunk on the Pope's Blood EP (1982)	2:47
11.	"Big-Jesus-Trash-Can"	Cave, Harvey	Junkyard	3:33
12.	"Dead Joe"	Cave, Lane	Junkyard	3:47
13.	"The Friend Catcher"	Cave	The Birthday Party (1980)	5:02
14.	"Six Inch Gold Blade"	Cave, Harvey	Junkyard	3:41
15.	"Hamlet (Pow, Pow, Pow)"	Cave, Howard	Junkyard	5:11
16.	"She’s Hit"	Cave, Tracy Pew	Junkyard	7:11
17.	"Fun House"	Dave Alexander, Ron Asheton, Scott Asheton, Iggy Pop	The Stooges' Fun House (1970)	8:29
Total length:				73:53

- Tracks 1−10: Recorded at The Venue, London, UK, 1981
- Tracks 11−16: Recorded at Aladin, Bremen, Germany, 1982
- Track 17: Recorded at Sporting, Athens, Greece, 1982

== Personnel ==
=== Birthday Party ===
- Phill Calvert − drums (tracks 1–10)
- Nick Cave − vocals
- Mick Harvey − guitar (tracks 1–10), drums (tracks 11–17)
- Rowland Howard − guitar
- Tracy Pew − bass
- Jim Thirlwell − saxophone (track 17)

=== Credits ===
- Mixing − Lindsay Gravina
- Mastering − David Macquarie
- Photography − Bleddyn Butcher

== Release history ==
Region	Date	Label	Format	Catalogue
United Kingdom	1999	4AD	CD	CAD 9005 CD
United Kingdom	29 July 2013	4AD	LP, CD	CAD 9005
United States	30 July 2013	4AD	LP, CD	CAD 9005
