= A Collection (The Birthday Party album) =

A Collection...

Compilation album by The Birthday Party
- Released: 1987
- Genre: Post-punk
- Labels: Missing Link; Suite Beat Music Group; SBCD 2017

The Birthday Party chronology
Junkyard (1982)	A Collection... (1987)	Mutiny/The Bad Seed (1983)

A Collection... is a compilation album by The Birthday Party. It contains tracks from the albums The Birthday Party, Prayers on Fire, Junkyard, and EPs and singles from that time period.

== Track listing ==
No.	Title	Original Album	Length
1.	"Blast Off!"	UK single "AD 111"	2:17
2.	"The Hair Shirt"	Hee Haw	4:02
3.	"King Ink"	Prayers on Fire	4:39
4.	"Junkyard"	Junkyard	5:48
5.	"Big Jesus Trash Can"	Junkyard	3:00
6.	"Release the Bats"	single "AD 111"	2:18
7.	"She's Hit"	Junkyard	6:05
8.	"Kathy's Kisses"	12" "Nick the Stripper"	4:19
9.	"The Friend Catcher"	Birthday Party	4:19
10.	"Zoo Music Girl"	Prayers on Fire	2:36
11.	"Nick the Stripper"	12" "Nick the Stripper"	3:50
12.	"Hamlet (Pow Pow Pow)"	Junkyard	5:33
