= It's Still Living =

Live album by The Birthday Party
- Released: May 1985
- Recorded: 15 January 1982; Astor Theatre; St Kilda, Victoria
- Genre: Post-punk
- Labels: Missing Link; Virgin

The Birthday Party chronology
Junkyard (1982)	It's Still Living (1982)	Mutiny/The Bad Seed (1983)

Professional ratings
Review scores
Source	Rating
Allmusic	3/5 stars

It's Still Living is a live album by The Birthday Party recorded at the Astor Theatre in St Kilda, Victoria on 15 January 1982, and released in May 1985. The initial LP release in 1985 by the band's former manager and backer Keith Glass, on his Missing Link label, was not sanctioned by the band. The sound quality of the recording is poor and it is marred by technical glitches (mainly the sounds of the amps crackling and shorting out). In 1991 the album was re-released on the Virgin label, with the LP being released on green vinyl.

The photograph of the band was taken by Peter Milne on the Birthday Party's first trip back home after taking up residency in London. This shoot was in the studio of Victoria College in High Street, Prahran. According to the album liner notes film footage of the concert was shot by Paul Goldman and Evan English (a.k.a. The Rich Kids). The footage, however, has never been released.

== Reception ==
Spin wrote, "Manic then droning, infused with secret pyrotechnic calm. Leader Nick Cave shrieks deeply bellowed frenzies from gloom and blues over the band’s patented rusty catcall guitar while apocalyptic Catholic images fly amok."

== Track listing ==
It's Still Living
No.	Title	Writer(s)	Length
1.	"King Ink"	Nick Cave, Rowland Howard	5:23
2.	"Zoo Music Girl"	Cave, Howard	3:06
3.	"The Dim Locator"	Howard	4:14
4.	"She's Hit"	Cave, Tracy Pew	6:17
5.	"A Dead Song"	Anita Lane, Cave	2:42
6.	"Pleasure Heads"	Cave	2:50
7.	"Junkyard"	Cave, Howard	6:18
8.	"Blast Off"	Howard	2:20
9.	"Release the Bats"	Mick Harvey, Cave	3:14
10.	"Nick the Stripper"	Cave	4:22
11.	"Big Jesus Trash Can"	Harvey, Cave	3:47
12.	"Dead Joe"	Lane, Cave	3:36

== Personnel ==
=== Birthday Party ===
- Phill Calvert – drums
- Nick Cave – vocals
- Mick Harvey – guitar
- Rowland Howard – guitar
- Tracy Pew – bass

=== Credits ===
- Engineer – Chris Thompson
- Mixed – The Birthday Party, Tony Cohen
- Artwork – James McDonald
- Photography – Peter Milne

== Chart positions ==
Chart (1985)	Peak position
UK Independent Albums Chart	19

== Release history ==
Region	Date	Label	Format	Catalogue
Australia	May 1985	Missing Link	LP	ING 009
Australia	1991	Missing Link	CD	LINK 28
Australia	1991	Virgin	LP, CD	VOZ 2048
