= Tuff Monks =

Australian musical group

- Origin: Melbourne, Victoria, Australia
- Years active: 1982
- Label: Au Go Go
- Spinoff of: The Birthday Party; the Go-Betweens
- Past members: Nick Cave; Robert Forster; Mick Harvey; Rowland S. Howard; Grant McLennan; Lindy Morrison

Tuff Monks were a short-lived band consisting of Nick Cave, Mick Harvey and Rowland S. Howard (each a member of the Birthday Party) with Robert Forster, Lindy Morrison and Grant McLennan (each a member of the Go-Betweens). Their only release was the 1982 7" 45 rpm single "After the Fireworks", on the Australian label, Au Go Go Records. The lead track was co-written by Cave, Forster and McLennan.

The collaboration came about when the Go-Betweens and the Birthday Party found themselves by happen-stance with overlapping booked studio time at AAV studio, Melbourne. The Birthday Party were having trouble completing their album, Junkyard (May 1982), and the two bands decided to join forces on a song during downtime. The idea to join forces, as well as the lyrics of "After the Fireworks" are Cave's, while the drums are distinctly Morrison's. The band's name was coined by Cave's then-girlfriend, Anita Lane. The collaboration performed live only once, at Richmond's Tiger Lounge venue doing a cover version of "Ring of Fire".

"After the Fireworks" was released as a single in the same year by Keith Glass, owner of the label Missing Link, who explained that he did so to recoup money he had lost on the Birthday Party in studio time.

"[The Birthday Party] were in AVV. It was costing top dollar—$1,000 a night... One night they came up with ["After the Fireworks"] because they had nothing better to do. So I said, "We'll use it as a vehicle to parlay against accrued costs"... I think Nick Cave came up with the idea to put it out as the Tuff Monks... It sold quite a few copies." – Keith Glass

Harvey later denied that the band even knew that the single was going to be released. Instead, he stated that the band members were surprised to learn of its impending release.

"That single was like a jam session we had in the studio which lasted about 2 hours and we never even finished... How on earth they could release it I really don't know. It's ludicrous, a travesty... The whole point of the exercise was no one was meant to be credited. It was just meant to be 'The Tuff Monks', no explanation, nothing." – Mick Harvey

Glass does not agree with Harvey's version, he takes credit for the single's cover picture and for the B-side material, which consists of a dub version of the A-side. The B-side track is named "After, After the Fireworks".

The song appeared on the CD release of Drunk on the Pope's Blood (the 1982 split LP between the Birthday Party and Lydia Lunch), the Birthday Party's 5–disc box set, The Definitive Missing Link Recordings 1979-1982, the second disc of the re-released CD edition of the Go-Betweens' album, Send Me a Lullaby (2002), and on an Australian various artists' compilation album, No Worries, on Hot Records.

== Personnel ==
- Nick Cave – lead vocals
- Robert Forster – guitar
- Mick Harvey – piano
- Rowland S. Howard – guitar
- Grant McLennan – guitar
- Lindy Morrison – drums

Credits:
