= Keith Glass =

- Also known as: Onie J. Holy
- Born: Keith Robert Glass; 17 September 1946 (age 80); Brighton, Victoria, Australia
- Genres: Country, folk, soul, R&B, pop, baroque rock
- Occupations: Musician, record label owner, producer, journalist
- Instruments: Guitar, vocals, bass guitar
- Years active: 1963–present
- Labels: Missing Link, Au Go Go, Virgin, Larrikin, Massive

Keith Robert Glass (born 17 September 1946) is an Australian country music singer-songwriter, guitarist, musical theatre actor, record label owner, producer and journalist. In April 1967 he formed a soul music group, Cam-Pact, which released four singles and an extended play, Something Easy. He left by June 1969 to appear in the Australian stage production of Hair as Berger (replaced by Reg Livermore in 1970). As a solo artist Glass released country and R&B albums, Going Over Old Ground (1989), Living Down My Past (1991), Smoke and Mirrors (1997), Southerly Buster (3 May 1999), Australian Soul (19 July 2001) and Miss Ala (26 October 2005).

In 1977 Glass and David Pepperell founded Missing Link Records, the following year he signed and managed The Boys Next Door, a punk band, featuring Nick Cave, Mick Harvey, Phill Calvert and Tracy Pew. Glass co-produced the group's 1980 album, The Birthday Party, before they relocated to London and changed their name to match its title. In October 1981 Australian music journalist, Glenn A. Baker, described the Missing Link label in Billboard which was "recognised for the cornerstone upon which much of Australia's new wave music movement has been built ... [Glass'] understanding and appreciation of the grass roots level of rock music is considered impeccable".

== Biography ==
Keith Robert Glass was born on 17 September 1946, and he received guitar lessons at Lou Toppano's Music School on his Maton Alver acoustic guitar. From 1958 Glass attended Brighton High School. In 1963 The Rising Sons were formed as a R&B band in Brighton with Glass on lead guitar, and three Brighton Grammar School students: Clive Davies on rhythm guitar, Dennis "Fred" Foster on drums and Russell Naughton on bass guitar. Their first gig was a dance for Brighton Grammar School. They played cover versions of instrumentals by The Ventures, Duane Eddy and The Shadows. They recorded material but none was released. Glass attempted first year of a law course at University of Melbourne but transferred to RMIT and starting a design course. By late 1965 The Rising Sons had disbanded.

In 1966 Glass and Foster formed a folk, baroque rock group, Eighteenth Century Quartet, with Frank Lyons on bass guitar; Hans Poulsen on guitar, vocals, bouzouki and mandolin; and John Pugh on guitar, violin, autoharp, harmonica and backing vocals. After issuing their debut single, "Rachel" in October, Poulsen left for a solo career. Glass wrote and sang lead on their second single, "Am I a Lover?" (December). Their live work "bore no relationship to the earlier folk-rock trappings" and they "began playing more uptempo soul/R&B/rock material". The group disbanded in March 1967.

In April 1967 Glass and Pugh formed a soul music group, Cam-Pact, with Mark Barnes on bass guitar, Bob Lloyd (a.k.a. Bob Tregilgas) on drums, and Chris Stockley on guitar. They released four singles, "Something Easy" (March 1968), "Drawing Room" (May), "Good Good Feelin'" (September) and "Potion of Love" (June 1969) and an extended play, Something Easy. In late 1968 Barnes had left and Glass took on bass guitar before he and Stockley also left by mid-1969. Stockley joined Axiom and from June that year Glass appeared in the Australian stage production of Hair as Berger (replaced by Reg Livermore in 1970) starting an 18-month run in Sydney. In 1970 after finishing Hair, Glass returned to Melbourne and formed country rock group, Sundown, with Barnes (ex-Cam-Pact); Broderick Smith on lead vocals and harmonica, Kerryn Tolhurst on guitar; (both ex-Adderley Smith Blues Band); and Barry Windley on drums (Chessmen, Cherokees, Quinn). The group only issued one single, "This Country of Mine" (June 1972), before disbanding. The track was written by Glass and was later recorded by Slim Dusty.

In 1971 Glass and David Pepperell (journalist, and vocalist of The Union) founded the Melbourne Import record store, Archie & Jughead's, which specialised in imported albums from Europe and America. In September 1973 Glass travelled to the United States to make business contacts for the store and with a view to getting his own songs published. Since 1977 he has pursued an intermittent solo career generally as a country musician. One such project was Keith Glass Band, an R&B and country rock group, which included Wayne Duncan on bass guitar (ex-Daddy Cool), Robert Souter on drums and Les Stacpool on guitar. With the addition of Wayne Burt (Daddy Cool, Jo Jo Zep & The Falcons) on guitar in October that year, the group's name changed to The Living Legends.

In 1978 the retail store was renamed Missing Link Records. In 1977 Glass and Pepperell had also founded an independent record label of the same name. Pepperell departed in 1978 and Glass signed The Boys Next Door, a punk band featuring Nick Cave, Mick Harvey, Phill Calvert and Tracy Pew, for whom Glass was also the manager. Missing Link issued the band's first EP, Hee Haw (1979) and the album, The Birthday Party (November 1980). Glass co-produced the album with The Boys Next Door and Tony Cohen. By the time of its release the group had relocated to London and renamed themselves as The Birthday Party. In May the label issued Ed Kuepper's alternate jazz-rock group, Laughing Clowns's debut eponymous EP, which was also engineered by Cohen.

In October that year Australian music journalist, Glenn A. Baker, writing for Billboard described the label which was "recognised for the cornerstone upon which much of Australia's new wave music movement has been built ... [Glass'] understanding and appreciation of the grass roots level of rock music is considered impeccable". In November Missing Link Records promoted a concert at Sydney's Paris Theatre by Laughing Clowns and The Birthday Party – they were supported by Brisbane group, The Go-Betweens. Glass signed them to his label, which issued their fourth single, "Your Turn My Turn", in April 1981 and followed by their first official album, Send Me a Lullaby, in November. The retail store had been run by Glass with his then-wife Helena Glass until they sold it late in 1981 to siblings Nigel and Diane Rennard. In July the following year Baker reported that Glass had been fined $750 for having sold US punk rockers, Dead Kennedys' 1981 single "Too Drunk to Fuck" in his store. The judge, Patrick Street, described the track as "the vilest of trash ... likely to deprave and corrupt" – Glass responded that the store had held some 40 recordings that were similar.

In late 1981 and early 1982 Glass was observing Cohen who was working in AAV studio in Richmond with The Birthday Party on their album, Junkyard (May 1982) when they were visited by The Go-Betweens. A jam session resulted in a single, "After the Fireworks", released by a short-lived super-group, Tuff Monks, which included members of both The Birthday Party and The Go-Betweens. Glass later recalled:

Sessions for ... Junkyard were turning into a disaster. [The Birthday Party] was ill prepared and drugged up. Enter a few Go-Betweens to the sessions and a night of tomfoolery produced a whopping big session bill and a track eventually released on Au-Go-Go called 'After the Fireworks'. Lacking any B side to go with it, we resorted to a backwards vocal remix titled 'After, After the Fireworks'. Opportunist? Exploitive? We had bills to pay.

— Keith Glass, The Missing Link Story (2004), by Various Artists.

Glass worked as a songwriter in Nashville before returning to Australia in 1986. Under the pseudonym, Onie J. Holy, he issued an extended play, God, Guns and Guts, on Au Go Go Records. He followed with country, blues groups: Keith Glass Honky Tonk Band and Keith Glass and the Tumblers. Glass contributed three tracks to the soundtrack for the Nadia Tass-directed film, Rikky and Pete (1988).

In 1988 he signed with Virgin Records and issued his solo album, Going Over Old Ground, the following year. In 1990 Glass co-produced the album, Two Roads: Live in Australia by US country rockers, Butch Hancock and Jimmie Dale Gilmore. In 1991 he released another solo album, Living Down My Past. He made several appearances at the Tamworth Country Music Festival in the early 1990s. Glass co-hosted a radio program, High in the Saddle, with Dave Dawson on 3RRR-FM. From the mid-1990s he was a member of the country music trio, Hamilton Glass and Young: with former Brighton High School mate, Mick Hamilton on guitar, and Gary Young (Daddy Cool, Jo Jo Zep & The Falcons) on drums. They issued three albums: Rocking Cowboy (Larrikin Records, 1993), Songs the Radio Taught Us (Massive, 1995) and Unidentified Playing Objects (Massive, 1996). Glass' third solo album, Smoke and Mirrors, appeared in 1997. Two years later he issued, Southerly Buster (3 May 1999).

In 2000 Glass and Hamilton combined for a CD, Clutching at Straws. On 19 July 2001 his next album, Australian Soul, appeared. To promote its release he toured North America with dates in southern US states and then in Canada – where he played with his namesake Keith Glass (William Keith Glass), guitarist for Prairie Oyster. In November he performed at the Frank Brown International Singer Songwriter Festival in Mobile, Alabama. From April 2002, Glass wrote for country music journal, Capital News. Also that year he produced Last Train... From Tennessee to Taree – a tribute album for US-born blue grass and skiffle artist, Johnny Duncan – which included two tracks written by Glass.

By 2004 Glass relocated to Mobile, where he recorded his next album, Miss Ala (26 October 2005). In June 2008 he told The Sydney Morning Herald that his favourite Australian album was The Reels' debut eponymous album (1979): "[they] changed my life. From the first night I saw them on Countdown and went to the gig straight afterwards, they enchanted me. So clever, so cutting and quite XTC now I look back on it. The jerky new wave sounds and the image took me in from day one". In May 2011 Glass and Hamilton issued an album, The John Laws Experience, using lyrics originally written as poetry by former radio commentator, John Laws. Glass opened a record store, Mobile Records, in April 2012, stocking vinyl albums.

== Discography ==
=== Albums ===
- Going Over Old Ground - Virgin (1989)
- Living Down My Past as Keith Glass and the Tumblers (1991)
- Rocking Cowboy as Hamilton, Glass and Young (1993)
- Songs the Radio Taught Us as Hamilton, Glass and Young (1995)
- Unidentified Playing Objects as Hamilton, Glass and Young (1996)
- Smoke and Mirrors (1997)
- Southerly Buster (1999)
- Clutching at Straws with Mick Hamilton (2000)
- True Blue Aussie Christmas with Mick Hamilton, as The Dimmer Twins (Mick and Keef) (2000)
- Australian Soul (2001)
- Miss Ala (2005)
- The John Laws Experience with Mick Hamilton (2011)
