= Happy Birthday (Birthday Party song) =

Single by The Boys Next Door
- B-side: "Riddle House"
- Released: 16 February 1980
- Recorded: Richmond Recorders, Melbourne, 1980
- Genre: Post-punk
- Length: 3:59
- Label: Missing Link
- Songwriter: Nick Cave Mick Harvey Rowland S. Howard
- Producer: Tony Cohen

The Boys Next Door singles chronology
"Shivers" (1979)	"Happy Birthday" (1980)	"Mr. Clarinet" (1980)

"Happy Birthday" is a 1980 song by The Boys Next Door. It was released as a single on 16 February 1980 on Missing Link. The song is not related to the popular birthday song "Happy Birthday to You". The first album it appeared on was The Birthday Party. It was later included as track two on the 1992 compilation Hits.

The release of the single was part of the band's rebranding of themselves as The Birthday Party before their relocation to London. It is notable for several reasons. The mundanity of the song's lyrical subject matter, an eleven-year-old boy's birthday party, contrasts strongly to the discordance of the music. The song is also a showcase for the sub-vocalisations that marked Nick Cave's early singing style, including grunts, wordless shrieks and on two occasions an impersonation of a barking dog.

== See also ==
- List of birthday songs

Happy birthday to you happy birthday to you Happy Birthday Happy Birthday Happy Birthday to you may god bless you happy birthday happy birthday dear ifra
