= Shivers (The Boys Next Door song) =

Single by The Birthday Party

Single by the Boys Next Door

from the album Door, Door
- B-side: "Dive Position"
- Released: May 1979
- Recorded: January 1979
- Studio: Richmond Recorders (Melbourne, Australia)
- Genre: Post-punk
- Length: 4:37
- Label: Mushroom
- Songwriter: Rowland S Howard
- Producer: The Boys Next Door

The Boys Next Door singles chronology
"These Boots Are Made for Walking" (1978)	"Shivers" (1979)	"Scatterbrain" / "Early Morning Brain" (1979)

"Shivers" is a song by the Australian post-punk band the Boys Next Door, who would later become the Birthday Party. It is the tenth and final track from the band's debut studio album Door, Door, released in 1979 on Mushroom Records. It was released as the album's only single in May 1979, backed with the B-side "Dive Position".

Written by guitarist Rowland S Howard at age 16, "Shivers" is a post-punk ballad featuring ironic lyrics regarding teenage relationships and suicide. Originally intended as humorous by Howard, he felt later it had been misinterpreted due to frontman Nick Cave's vocal delivery on the Boys Next Door version. Despite later distancing himself from the song, "Shivers" remained Howard's most requested song during his lifetime and was met with critical acclaim. It has since been cited as one of the most popular cult hits in Australian music.

Several versions of "Shivers" have been released—including demo and solo recordings by Howard—and it has been covered by a variety of artists, including Marie Hoy, Laura Jane Grace, Courtney Barnett, Julia Jacklin, Divine Fits, Cat Power, the Screaming Jets, and the Folk Bitch Trio.

== Origin and recording ==
In 1976, at age 16 and as a member of the Melbourne punk rock band Young Charlatans, Howard wrote "Shivers". Discussing the song's origins, Howard said that "Shivers" was "intended as an ironic comment on the way that I felt that people I knew were making hysterical things out of what were essentially high school crushes". He further explained that the emotional responses of people he knew who were in relationships seemed "incredibly insincere and blown out of proportion" and inspired the cynical lyrics of the song.

Howard composed "Shivers" on an Ibanez Gibson Firebird copy, an electric guitar on which he performed on the first known recording of the song. Recorded as part of a series of demos for the Young Charlatans in 1978, it featured Howard on vocals and guitar, Ollie Olsen on guitar, Janine Hall on bass and Jeff Wegener on drums. They recorded the first (and second) version of 'Shivers' as part of their unreleased demos, which were made by Bruce Milne for a future single on his Au Go Go Records label.

During sessions for Door, Door at Richmond Recorders in Melbourne in January 1979, the Boys Next Door recorded "Shivers". Engineer Tony Cohen suggested that Howard perform the vocals for the track, arguing that his voice was best fitted for his own songs. However, the band's regular vocalist, Nick Cave, insisted on singing on the recording. Howard said later that as a result of Cave's vocals, "Shivers" was "interpreted completely differently and now the song, to most peoples' minds, is something completely different from what I intended it to be". In hindsight, Cave noted that Howard's vocals should have been recorded, as Cave was "never able to do that song justice".

== Music and lyrics ==
"Shivers" is a post-punk ballad with a length of four minutes and thirty-seven seconds. It is set in common time (4/4) and has a slow tempo of 60 beats per minute. The song is composed in the key of A major and on the Boys Next Door version, Nick Cave's vocal range spans one octave from D_{3} to E_{4}.

"Shivers" (1979)
The opening lyrics to "Shivers" have been described as "famous", as well as typical of Rowland S Howard's "wry, guarded romanticism".

Howard wrote intentionally cynical lyrics to "Shivers" regarding relationships and suicide. According to Kelsey Munro of the Sydney Morning Herald, the song "exhibits Howard's enduring gallows humour in its wry treatment of the overwrought protagonist". The first lyrics "I've been contemplating suicide / but it really doesn't suit my style" have been also branded by the Sydney Morning Herald's Jake Wilson as "famous opening lines" and typical of Howard's "wry, guarded romanticism".

According to members of the Boys Next Door, Howard's songwriting was "more precious and stolid" than Cave's or guitarist–keyboardist Mick Harvey's attempts, with "Shivers" and his other songs generally being centred "around a bassline". The final version of "Shivers" featured on Door, Door reflected this, and included only a two-chord progression and four musical instruments: guitar, bass, piano and violin.

== Release and reception ==
"Shivers" was originally released by the Young Charlatans as part of a Fast Forward cassette compilation, which was issued in April 1981 after the band's dissolution. It was rereleased on CD on the various artists compilation album Inner City Sound: Australian Punk & Post-Punk (2006). The Boys Next Door version was released as Door, Door's only single in May 1979 on Mushroom Records. It was issued as a 7-inch single, backed with "Dive Position". The single soon went out of print, and a second pressing was issued later the same year. The band changed their name to the Birthday Party after relocating to London, England in 1980 and all of their recordings of "Shivers" are credited to the Boys Next Door.

"Shivers" received critical acclaim and became a major underground success in Australia, bringing more national attention to the band. Nick Cave cited it in hindsight as the main reason for the Boys Next Door's eminence. In a retrospective review for AllMusic, critic Will Lerner wrote that "it's impressive how, even at this early stage, Nick Cave was a confident and unique singer, perfectly aware of the strengths and limitations of his voice … he knows how to come across in a scary and theatrical manner that perfectly complements the music. Nowhere is this more apparent than on … 'Shivers', an unashamedly melodramatic example of post-adolescent anguish". "Shivers", along with other songs Howard composed, were "crucial to guiding the band in the darker, wilder direction" that defined the Birthday Party's music, according to Dan Lawrence of Stereogum. The song has since been considered an Australian classic and labelled by ABC Television as "possibly Australia's most enduring cult hit".

A music video for "Shivers" was directed by Paul Goldman in 1979. It is featured on Pleasure Heads Must Burn (1984), a video album released by the Birthday Party. It was directed for a first year University video assignment.

== Live performances ==
"Shivers" was first performed at Young Charlatans concerts in the late 1970s, of which there were only 13 during the band's career. In 1978, prior to the recording of Door, Door, the Boys Next Door performed "Shivers" with Howard on vocals and Cave on guitar. After the song's release, and changing their name to the Birthday Party, the band performed "Shivers" with their standard line-up of Cave on vocals, Howard and Mick Harvey on guitar, Tracy Pew on bass and Phill Calvert on drums. Cave commented that he "used to dread 'Shivers' coming up in the set" due to the fact "it required a certain amount of proficiency [and] certain amount of talent to sing" because it was one of the band's only melodic songs.

During Howard's solo concerts from 1983 to 1999, "Shivers" was the song most requested by audience members. However, by the time of his final tour in 2009—the year he died—he had stopped receiving requests for it. In an October 2009 interview, Howard commented on his relationship with the song, and its position in his setlists, stating: "I have just tried, perhaps finally successfully, to divorce myself from the song. It's impossible for me to recreate what I was trying to do when I wrote that song so whilst I can see that people have an attachment to it, I don't. I feel like, when I did use to do it in shows, I was doing a cover of some song that had been around forever. That's how it felt. And I guess that is a strange way to feel about a song you wrote, so yeah, I am happy to not have to do it these days".

== Track listing ==
Australia 7-inch single (Mushroom Records, K7492)

1. "Shivers" (Howard) – 4:37
2. "Dive Position" (Cave) – 2:42

== Personnel ==
All personnel credits are adapted from Door, Door's album notes.

The Boys Next Door

- Phill Calvert – drums
- Nick Cave – vocals
- Mick Harvey – guitar, keyboards
- Rowland S Howard – guitar
- Tracy Pew – bass

Additional musicians

- Henry Vyhnal – violin

Technical personnel

- The Boys Next Door – production
- Tony Cohen – engineering
- Andrew Duffield – electronics

== The Screaming Jets version ==
"Shivers"

Single by the Screaming Jets

from the album Tear of Thought
- Released: 18 January 1993
- Length: 4:33
- Label: rooArt
- Songwriter: Rowland Howard
- Producer: Steve James

The Screaming Jets singles chronology
"Think" (1992)	"Shivers" (1993)	"Here I Go" (1993)

Australian hard rock band the Screaming Jets covered "Shivers" and released it as the second single from their second studio album, Tear of Thought, on 17 January 1993. It peaked at number 19 on the Australian Singles Chart and was ranked at number 95 on Australia's year-end chart.

=== Track listing ===
Australian CD single

1. "Shivers" – 4:32
2. "Think" (acoustic) – 5:24
3. "Fix the Feeble" (acoustic) – 3:22
4. "Shivers" (acoustic) – 5:02

=== Charts ===
==== Weekly charts ====
Weekly chart performance for "Shivers"
Chart (1993)	Peak position
Australia (ARIA)	19

==== Year-end charts ====
Year-end chart performance for "Shivers"
Chart (1993)	Position
Australia (ARIA)	95

== Other cover versions ==
Since its original release, "Shivers" has been covered by several artists. A live version recorded in Melbourne in 1982 by the Big Bang Combo was issued on volume 13 of the cassette magazine Fast Forward in October of that year. Musician and actress Marie Hoy performed the song in the 1986 independent film Dogs in Space; it appeared on the film's supporting soundtrack released in February 1987 on Chase Records.

In 1996, Nick Cave performed guest vocals with Israeli singer-songwriter Inbal Perlmuter on a version of "Shivers" released by her band Ha-Mechashefot (The Witches) on their covers album, Undercover.
