= Blue Ruin (band) =

Australian blues rock band

- Also known as: Scrap Museum
- Origin: Melbourne, Victoria, Australia
- Genre: Blues rock
- Years active: 1984–1995; 2006; 2007; 2012; 2016
- Labels: Major; Rampant; rooArt; Foghorn/MDS
- Past members: Frank Borg; Adam Learner; Ian "Quincy" McLean; Mulaim Vela; Phill Calvert; Simon Capp; John Hall; Greg Heynes

Blue Ruin were an Australian blues rock band, which started as Scrap Museum in 1984. Their third studio album, I'm Gonna Smile (December 1990), was nominated for Best Independent Release at the ARIA Music Awards of 1991. The group had released three other studio albums, Such Sweet Thunder (January 1986), Flame (May 1987) and Tattoo Tears (1993), before disbanding in 1995. Mainstay members were Ian "Quincy" McLean on lead vocals and Mulaim Vela on lead guitar.

== History ==
Blue Ruin started as a blues rock quartet, Scrap Museum, in 1984 in Melbourne by singer Ian "Quincy" McLean, guitarist Mulaim Vela, bassist Adam Learner and drummer Frank Borg. McLean and Vela had attended Camberwell High School; they began song writing together in 1981. The group issued a single, "Say Die", in that year via the Rampant Records label. They supported local gigs by the Dead Kennedys, and Iggy Pop.

Ex-the Birthday Party drummer Phill Calvert replaced Borg and they changed their name to Blue Ruin in 1985. That name references a variety of bathtub gin. Such Sweet Thunder (January 1986), their first studio album, was recorded over three days with Tony Cohen producing and engineering. Patrick Donovan of The Age, in February 2006, described how, "their raw, dark and menacing debut [album] was an intimidating and intoxicating brew... it continues to rumble and tap into dark corners of the psyche with each listen."

Their second album, Flame, appeared in May 1987, which was recorded at Perth's Planet Studios with John Rees producing and Mark Woods engineering. The Canberra Times' Andree Coelli observed, "[they are] quietly making [an] impact on the Australian music scene. It is not hit-debut-single stardom for this band but a long association with music, a growing following over the past two years and a rigid belief in the power of the independent label which determines its success." Donovan compared it to their debut, and found, "[it] was better still, incorporating jazz and funk and replacing some of the harder edges with strings and Sharon Jessop's powerful gospel back-up vocals." It was preceded by their single, "Bad Gin", in March with an associated music video shown on TV pop music shows, Countdown and Rock Arena.

Simon Capp replaced Adam Learner on bass guitar. The group spent February 1988 in Europe and the United States, "to arrange the release of the band's material and organise future overseas tours." Blue Ruin relocated to London in September 1988: before leaving McLean had explained to Coelli's associate Amanda Lynch, "We're expecting to play a bit, get press happening, get a record out and start the thing at grass-roots level ... basically that's the way we've done things in Australia." "For twelve months the band did the rounds of the London pub and club circuit, issuing an EP Lighthouse Girl on the Imaginary label", according to McFarlane.

Independent label rooArt issued a live album, Strange Things in the Corner, in February 1989, while the group were in the United Kingdom. It had been recorded early in the previous year. McFarlane observed, "[it] showcased McLean's raw, bluesy vocals and Mulaim Vela's astonishing guitar technique." According to McLean his song writing approach, "[is] to write lyrics that mean something to me. They don't have to be blatantly obvious to anyone else, but you can't express anything to anyone else if it doesn't mean anything to you at first." Lynch felt that their live work, "With its special brand of blues-based rock with elements of funk, country and western and 'elements of a lot of things', the experience should be fun."

The group returned to Melbourne and in December 1990 they issued their third studio album, I'm Gonna Smile, via Foghorn Records/MDS. Soon after its appearance Calvert was replaced on drums by John Hall who was replaced in turn by Greg Heynes. Learner returned to replace Capp on bass guitar. At the ARIA Music Awards of 1991 the album was nominated for Best Independent Release. The line-up of Learner, Heynes, McClean and Vela released the group's fourth and final studio album, Tattoo Tears, late in 1993. They broke up by the end of 1995.

=== After disbandment ===
Vela joined the HaBiBis, a traditional Greek music ensemble, on rhythm guitar in 1995. As of September 2006 the line-up with Mulaim Vela was Irene Vela on laouto, guitar, mandola and bouzouki; Achilles Yiangoulli on darabuka, toubeleki, bouzouki, guitar and lead vocals; Wendy Rowlands on accordion, violin and vocals; Sotoris on clarinet; Nick Tsiavos on double bass; Pascal Latras on vocals; and Racheal Cogan on recorder and vocals. In 1997 McClean formed Quincy McLean and the Smooth Bastards with Heynes on drums, Paul Bione on Hammond organ and Moog synthesiser, Rob Gray on bass guitar and Stratos Pavlis on guitar. McFarlane described that group's debut album, Friends in Low Places (September 1998), as "raunchy blues'n'soul, songs on the album ranged from a cover of Captain Beefheart's 'I Love You, You Big Dummy' to the final track, the funky 'In a Groove'." Blue Ruin periodically reformed for shows in 2006, 2007, 2012 and 2016.

== Members ==
- Frank Borg – drums
- Adam Learner – bass guitar
- Ian "Quincy" McLean – lead vocals
- Mulaim Vela – lead guitar
- Phill Calvert – drums
- Simon Capp – bass guitar
- John Hall – drums
- Greg Heynes – drums

== Discography ==
=== Studio albums ===
Title	Album details
Such Sweet Thunder	Released: 1986; Label: Major Records (MRLP 007); Format: LP, Cassette
Flame	Released: 1987; Label: Rampant Releases (RR027); Format: LP, Cassette
I'm Gonna Smile	Released: December 1990; Label: MDS (LPBR002); Format: LP, CD, Cassette
Tattoo Tears	Released: 1993; Label: Foghorn Records (FOG 003); Format: CD

=== Live albums ===
Title	Album details
Strange Things in the Corner	Released: 1988; Label: rooArt (836 657-1); Format: LP, CD, Cassette; Note: Recorded at the Corner Hotel, Richmond in May 1988.

=== Singles ===
Title	Year	Album
"Venus"	1986	non album single
"Bad Gin"	1987	Flame
"What A Hellu'va Woman"	1987	Such Sweet Thunder
"Lighthouse Girl"	1989	I'm Gonna Smile
"She Don't Go No More"	1990	I'm Gonna Smile
"Shotgun Hips"	1990	I'm Gonna Smile

== Awards and nominations ==
=== ARIA Music Awards ===
The ARIA Music Awards are a set of annual ceremonies presented by Australian Recording Industry Association (ARIA), which recognise excellence, innovation, and achievement across all genres of the music of Australia. They commenced in 1987.

Year	Nominee / work	Award	Result	Ref.
1991	I'm Gonna Smile	Best Independent Release	Nominated	
