= Bag of Oats =

EP by Mutiny
- Released: 2002
- Genre: Folk punk
- Length: 17:37
- Label: Haul Away

Mutiny chronology
Rum Rebellion (1997)	Bag of Oats (2002)	Digging for Gold (2002)

Bag of Oats is a six-track extended play by the Australian folk punk band, Mutiny. It was released in 2002 via Haul Away Records. All the tracks were written by the group's Greg Stainsby.

== Reception ==
Andy Carr of Roaring Jack Archives reviewed both Bag of Oats (2002) and the following three-track, "Digging for Gold", issued later in the same year. He observed, "Throughout there's a spirit of rebellion and an understanding that there are ways out of the poverty and meaninglessness of life in the suburbs. The historic angle comes into play in songs like 'Police Strike Riot', which relives the police strike which left Melbourne lawless briefly in 1929... One of the standouts for me is the slower and hugely melodic 'Struggle Town' and its stories of fighting in the streets." Shite n Onions' Brian Gillispie felt, "[it] will knock yer pegleg off ... Musically, the album has no weak spots either. It really is folk punk for punk folks. I tried to pick a favorite track from this album, but I couldn't do it. Each and every song is as solid as stone."

== Track listing ==
All tracks were written by Greg Stainsby.

1. "Bag of Oats" – 3:02
2. "William Jones" – 3:06
3. "Shot Tower" – 3:39
4. "Struggle Town" – 2:48
5. "Two Up Alley" – 3:16
6. "Police Strike Riot" – 1:47

Credits:

== Personnel ==
- Alice Green – bass guitar
- Briony Grigg – backing vocals
- Chris Patches – lead vocals, acoustic guitar
- Damien Shepherd – drums (tracks 5–6)
- Greg Stainsby – guitar, mandolin, vocals
- Lobby – tin whistle, trumpet
- Phil – piano accordion
- Sean – drums (tracks 1–4)
- Steph – fiddle

Credits:
