= Hee Haw (disambiguation) =

Hee Haw is an American television variety show.

Hee Haw may also refer to:

- the cry of a donkey
- Hee Haw (EP), EP by The Birthday Party
- Hee Haw (album), album by The Birthday Party
- Heee Haw, citrus soda

== See also ==
- Bray (disambiguation)
