= Drunk on the Pope's Blood/The Agony Is the Ecstacy =

EP by The Birthday Party/Lydia Lunch
- Released: February 18, 1982
- Recorded: November 26, 1981
- Venues: The Venue, London, England
- Genres: Post-punk; avant-punk
- Length: 34:47
- Label: 4AD

The Birthday Party chronology
Prayers on Fire (1981)	Drunk on the Pope's Blood/The Agony Is the Ecstacy (1982)	Junkyard (1982)

Lydia Lunch chronology
Queen of Siam (1980)	The Agony Is the Ecstacy (1982)	13.13 (1982)

Professional ratings
Review scores
Source	Rating
Allmusic	3/5 stars

Drunk on the Pope's Blood/The Agony Is the Ecstacy is a split compilation EP by the post-punk acts The Birthday Party and Lydia Lunch, released on February 18, 1982, through 4AD. It contains live material from a show performed on November 26, 1981, at The Venue in London. Three of the four Birthday Party tracks were included on their Live 1981-82 CD. Their version of the song "Loose" and the Lydia Lunch piece have never been officially reissued on CD. The Lydia Lunch side is a single track recorded up to the run-out groove, causing the song to play endlessly on manual turntables.

== Track listing ==
Side one
No.	Title	Writer(s)	Length
1.	"Pleasure Heads"	Nick Cave	3:40
2.	"King Ink"	Nick Cave, Rowland S. Howard	6:02
3.	"Zoo-Music Girl"	Nick Cave, Rowland S. Howard	3:00
4.	"Loose"	The Stooges	5:33

Side two
No.	Title	Writer(s)	Length
1.	"The Agony Is the Ecstacy"	Lydia Lunch	16:31
Total length:			34:47

== Personnel ==
Side one

- Nick Cave – vocals
- Mick Harvey – guitar
- Rowland S. Howard – guitar
- Tracy Pew – bass guitar
- Phill Calvert – drums

Side two

- Lydia Lunch – vocals
- Murray Mitchell – guitar
- Steven Severin – guitar
- Kristian Hoffman – drums

== Charts ==
Chart (1982)	Peak position
UK Indie Chart	2
