= Hee Haw (EP) =

1980 EP by The Birthday Party

EP by The Boys Next Door
- Released: 8 December 1979
- Recorded: July–August 1979
- Studios: Richmond Recorders, Melbourne, Australia
- Genre: Post-punk
- Label: Missing Link Records (MLEP-3)
- Producer: The Boys Next Door

The Boys Next Door chronology
Door, Door (1979)	Hee Haw (1979)	The Birthday Party (1980)

Professional ratings
Review scores
Source	Rating
Underground	3/3 stars

Hee Haw is the second release and first EP by the Australian post-punk band the Boys Next Door (later renamed the Birthday Party). The Hee Haw EP was released in 1979 by the independent label, Missing Link Records.

== Background ==
By 1978-9, the Boys Next Door were making efforts to distinguish themselves from Melbourne's punk and post-punk bands. The core members – Nick Cave, Mick Harvey, Phill Calvert and Tracy Pew – had been joined by Rowland S. Howard on guitar in 1978. The Boys Next Door released an album (Door, Door) on the Mushroom label in 1979 (recorded in separate sessions in mid-1978 and early 1979).

After the release of Door, Door, the Boys Next Door transferred to the independent label, Missing Link Records, and took on label owner Keith Glass as their manager. Cave said, "We played [Hee Haw] to Michael Gudinski of Mushroom Records and he wasn't really interested." The tracks for the Hee Haw EP were recorded during July and August 1979 at Richmond Recorders in Melbourne, engineered by Tony Cohen. The five-track EP was released in December 1979. The artwork on the cover and insert sheet was done by Marcus Bergner.

== Music ==
The Hee Haw EP represents a musical departure from the relatively conventional punk/pop songs on Door, Door. The EP introduces a more abrasive, rhythmic and exploratory sound that was further developed when the band re-located to the UK (and changed their name to the Birthday Party).

Two of the songs on the EP, "The Red Clock" and "The Hair Shirt", the former sung by Rowland S. Howard and the latter by Nick Cave, were included on the Boys Next Door's second album entitled The Birthday Party in 1980. The songs on the EP and The Birthday Party LP appeared on the 1989 Birthday Party compilation album, also titled Hee Haw.

== Track listing ==
1. "A Catholic Skin" (Nick Cave)
2. "The Red Clock" (Rowland S. Howard)
3. "Faint Heart" (Cave)
4. "Death by Drowning" (Howard)
5. "The Hair Shirt" (Cave)

== Re-release ==
The EP was reissued in Australia in December 1983 by Missing Link (ING008), affixed with a sticker giving the name Birthday Party. It was again reissued by the same label in 1987.

== Hee Haw (1989) ==
Hee Haw

Compilation album by The Boys Next Door/The Birthday Party
- Released: 7 August 1989
- Recorded: August 1979 – January 1980
- Studios: Richmond Recorders, Melbourne, Australia
- Genre: Post-punk
- Length: 40:44
- Label: 4AD
- Producer: The Birthday Party

The Boys Next Door/The Birthday Party chronology
Mutiny/The Bad Seed (1983)	Hee Haw (1989)	Hits (1992)

Professional ratings
Review scores
Source	Rating
AllMusic	3/5 stars

The tracks from the original Hee Haw EP were re-released on CD by 4AD on 7 August 1989 as part of a compilation of early recordings under the name of the Birthday Party; this album was also called Hee Haw. It includes all the tracks from the original Hee Haw EP by the Boys Next Door and from their second album entitled The Birthday Party (before they changed the band name to the album title).

=== Track listing ===
No.	Title	Writer(s)	Length
1.	"Mr. Clarinet"	Nick Cave	3:47
2.	"Happy Birthday"	Cave, Mick Harvey, Rowland S. Howard	3:50
3.	"Hats on Wrong"	Cave	2:40
4.	"Guilt Parade"	Howard	2:52
5.	"The Friend Catcher"	Cave	4:22
6.	"Waving My Arms"	Howard	2:15
7.	"Catman"	Gene Vincent, Sheriff Tex Davis	2:27
8.	"Riddle House"	Howard	2:42
9.	"A Catholic Skin"	Cave	2:25
10.	"The Red Clock"	Howard	2:47
11.	"Faint Heart"	Cave	2:51
12.	"Death by Drowning"	Howard	3:10
13.	"The Hair Shirt"	Cave	4:05
Total length:			40:44

=== Band members ===
- Nick Cave − vocals
- Mick Harvey − guitar, organ, bass (on 'Death by Drowning')
- Rowland S. Howard − guitar, saxophone
- Tracy Pew − bass, clarinet
- Phill Calvert − drums
