= Co-op Brewery =

Studio album by Mutiny
- Released: 7 August 2006
- Recorded: 2006
- Genre: Folk punk
- Label: Missing Ling; Fistolo

Mutiny chronology
Digging for Gold (2002)	Co-op Brewery (2006)

Co-op Brewery is an album by the Australian band, Mutiny, released by Missing Link Records locally, and by Fistolo Records in the United States. Brian Gillespie of Shite n Onions felt the group provide "nautical-folk-punk that leans toward sea shanties, and ballads."

Co-op Brewery reflects Mutiny's greater ability to pay for production—it was recorded at Birdland Studios and Lindsay Gravina mixed "Digging for Gold." "Abbotsford Co-Operative Brewery" tells the tale of an attempt to wrest the control of the beer brewing industry back off the main players. "Free Soup Daily" relates the story of someone who is queuing to be fed at a soup kitchen, and "Digging for Gold" relates life on the Victorian Goldfields.

== Track listing ==
1. "Free Soup Daily" - 3:36
2. "Eighty Punks and an Old P.A." - 2:08
3. "Brisbane Bandits" - 3:13
4. "Abbotsford Co-operative Brewery" - 3:19
5. "Jumping the Rattler" - 4:08
6. "Convict Rum Song" - 1:22
7. "Digging for Gold" - 2:47
8. "Dirty Jig" - 3:40

== Personnel ==
- Chris Patches – vocals
- Alice Green – bass
- Greg Stainsby – guitar, mandolin
- Dan Green – piano accordion, backing vocals
- Calum Holland – acoustic guitar, backing vocals
- Paul Kavanagh – drums, bodhran, backing vocals

== "Digging for Gold" ==
"Digging for Gold" is a single by the Australian folk punk band, Mutiny, released late in 2002 by Haul Away Records. Andy Carr of Roaring Jack website described their sound as "folk-punk for punk folks" with the two tracks, "Digging for Gold" and "Bag of Oats" as "incredibly fast-paced ... [which] are driven by blinding accordion and mandolin riffs (great work from Dan Green and Gregory Bones respectively) and augmented by the raging tin whistle of Lobby."

=== Track listing ===
1. "Digging for Gold"
2. "Bag of Oats"
3. "Heave Up"
