= Mutiny (band) =

Australian folk punk band

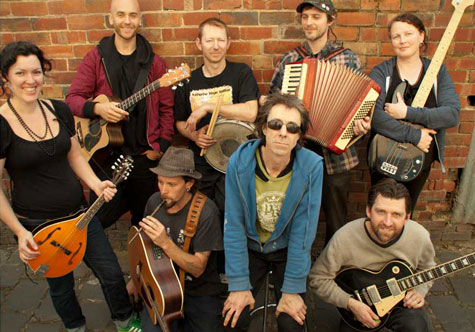

Background information
- Origin: Melbourne, Victoria, Australia
- Genres: Folk punk
- Years active: 1991–present
- Members: Chris Patches; Greg Stainsby; Alice Green; Calum Holland; Marko Jennings; Kav Kavanagh

Mutiny are an Australian folk punk band based in Melbourne. Their slogan is "Folk punk for punk folk". They first formed in 1991 and have performed in Australia, Europe and the US. The original members were Chris Patches (vocals, drums), Greg Stainsby (guitar, mandolin), Briony Grigg (vocals, 12 string guitar), and Alice Green (bass). Chris originally sang in Melbourne crust band Compost. Greg and Alice were members of Melbourne punk band Insyte. Their songs tend to revolve around lives and issues of the working class and convicts, with a strong thread of Australian history throughout all of their releases. Their sound is often referred to as 'pirate' as their melding of folk sounds with punk imagery, politics and style gives many of their songs the feel of a jig. The use of a mandolin and piano accordion add to this feel as well. They have a strong anti-authoritarian philosophy and this comes out in their music and live shows. They played throughout the UK and Europe in 1994 and again through Europe in 1997. They also toured the United States in 1999. Greg Stainsby, Alice Green and Mark Jennings are currently also in The Currency.

== Members ==
=== Current members ===
- Chris Patches (1991–present: vocals)
- Greg Stainsby (1991–present: guitar, mandolin)
- Alice Green (1991–present: bass)
- Calum Holland (2002–present: guitar)
- Marko Jennings (2006–present: guitar, mandolin)
- Kav Kavanagh (2002–present: drums)
- John Sausage (2004–present: piano accordion)

=== Past members ===
- Briony Grigg (1991–1999: vocals, 12 string guitar, mandolin)
- L'hibou Hornung (1992–1994: violin)
- Michelle Lewit (1996–1997: violin)
- Damien Shepherd (1998 – 1999: drums)
- Dan Green (2002–2004: piano accordion)

== Discography ==
=== Albums ===
- Folk Punk for Punk Folk cassette (1992 self-release)
- Rum Rebellion (1997 Deported Records/1999 Hell's Ditch Records/2004 Fistolo Records)
- Co-op Brewery (2006 Missing Link Records/Fistolo Records)
- Drink to Better Days (2013 Four || Four Music)

=== Singles/EPs ===
- Any Way You Can CDEP (1993 self-release)
- Bodgy Tatts CDEP (1996 self-release)
- "Digging for Gold" CD single (2002 Haul Away Records)
- Bag of Oats CDEP (2002 Haul Away Records)

=== Compilation tracks ===
- "Here's to Adventure" on 0 to 60 in 59 bands (2007 No!No Records)
- "Struggle Town" and "Digging for Gold" on Shite 'n' Onions Vol 2: What the Shite (2006 Omnium Records)
