= World of Stone (EP) =

EP by Hunters & Collectors
- Released: January 1982
- Recorded: 1981
- Genre: Rock
- Length: 17:44
- Label: White/Mushroom
- Producer: Tony Cohen, Hunters & Collectors

Hunters & Collectors EP chronology
World of Stone (1982)	Payload (1982)

World of Stone is the debut extended play by Australian rock music group, Hunters & Collectors, which was issued in January 1982. Mushroom Records had specifically started the White Label imprint for alternative artists when signing the group. World of Stone was co-produced by the group and Tony Cohen and reached No. 50 on the Kent Music Report Singles Chart.

== Background ==
World of Stone is a three-track extended play released by Australian rock group, Hunters & Collectors, in January 1982. The group had formed in the previous year by former members of Melbourne-based group, Jetsonnes: John Archer on electric bass; Doug Falconer on drums; Robert Miles as live sound and art director; Mark Seymour on guitar and lead vocals; and Ray Tosti-Guerra on guitar and vocals. They were joined by Geoff Crosby on keyboards and Greg Perano on percussion (ex-True Wheels). Initially they were "a collective rather than a band, an excursion into funk-rock rhythms and industrial Kraut-rock". Early performances included "banging of rubbish bin lids or fire extinguishers".

For some performances they were expanded by a horn section, later dubbed Horns of Contempt, which comprised a variable line-up including Nigel Crocker and Michael Waters, both on trombone; Jack Howard, Andy Lynn and Chris Malherbe, each on trumpet; and Jeremy Smith on French horn. According to Australian musicologist, Ian McFarlane, they were "hailed as the hip 'Next Big Thing' and the band to experience live". Mushroom Records specifically formed a new alternative label, White Label Records, when they signed Hunters & Collectors.

The EP was co-produced by Tony Cohen and the group. In February it reached No. 50 on the Australian Kent Music Report Singles Chart, with the title track also credited at the same position. The EP remained in the top 100 for eight weeks. According to Seymour, his fellow band member Crosby was heavily influenced by Brian Eno and used the Korg MS-20 on "World of Stone" to provide a "deep, almost subsonic synth drone". Seymour felt that the drone, which was used on several tracks during the band's career, "conveys a broad limitless horizon".

== Track listing ==
All tracks are written by John Archer, Geoff Crosby, Doug Falconer, Robert Miles, Greg Perano, Mark Seymour and Ray Tosti-Guerra.

No.	Title	Length
1.	"World of Stone"	7:31
2.	"Watcher"	4:42
3.	"Loinclothing"	5:28
Total length:		17:44

== Charts ==
Chart (1982)	Peak position
Australia (Kent Music Report)	50

== Personnel ==
Credited to:

Hunters & Collectors members

- John Archer – bass guitar, backing vocals
- Geoff Crosby – keyboards, Korg MS-20
- Doug Falconer – drums
- Robert Miles – live sound, art director
- Greg Perano – percussion
- Mark Seymour – guitar, lead vocals, bass guitar
- Ray Tosti-Guerra – guitar, backing vocals

Horns of Contempt members (on "Loinclothing")

- Nigel Crocker – trombone
- Jack Howard – trumpet
- Andy Lynn – trumpet
- Chris Malherbe – trumpet
- Jeremy Smith – French horn
- Michael Waters – trombone

Additional musicians

- Karen Ansel – backing vocals (on "Loinclothing")

Production details

- Producer – Hunters & Collectors, Tony Cohen
- Engineer – Tony Cohen
- Mixer, cover art – Robert Miles
