= The Birthday Party (The Boys Next Door album) =

Studio album by The Boys Next Door / The Birthday Party
- Released: November 1980
- Recorded: July 1979, January–February 1980
- Studios: Richmond Recorders, Melbourne
- Genre: Post-punk
- Length: 32:00
- Labels: Missing Link Records; CBS Records; 4AD
- Producers: The Boys Next Door, Tony Cohen, Keith Glass

The Boys Next Door / The Birthday Party chronology
Hee Haw (EP) (1979)	The Birthday Party (1980)	Prayers on Fire (1981)

Alternative cover art
- 1982 re-issue cover, credited to the Birthday Party

Professional ratings
Review scores
Source	Rating
AllMusic	4/5 stars
The Encyclopedia of Popular Music	3/5 stars
The Rolling Stone Album Guide	3.5/5 stars

The Birthday Party is a 1980 album credited to Australian rock band the Boys Next Door / the Birthday Party under both names as they were in transition between the names. The album was produced by The Boys Next Door, Tony Cohen, and Keith Glass; it was recorded with Cohen engineering at Richmond Recorders Studios in Melbourne from July 1979 to February 1980.

The album differs from the new-wave pop-punk style of their debut Door, Door (released the year earlier), moving towards the dark and chaotic post-punk style they would later become known for as The Birthday Party.

The album in its entirety has been reissued on CD as part of the Hee Haw compilation along with the Hee Haw EP. Two of the album's songs, "The Red Clock" and "The Hair Shirt" were originally included on the Hee Haw EP, released in 1979.

== Recording ==
Tracy Pew was absent from the recording session for "Mr. Clarinet", so he recorded the bass later.

Engineer Tony Cohen said Richmond Recorders was a "non-reverberant, acoustically dead" design, forcing him and the band to experiment to get interesting sounds. He said, "On "The Hair Shirt", Nick sang through a telephone. He wanted a screechy voice underneath his lead vocal. Rowland always wanted more treble on his guitar, so I bought in sheets of corrugated iron and made a tunnel covering his amp."

== Track listing ==
All tracks are written by Nick Cave, except where noted.

No.	Title	Writer(s)	Length
1.	"Mr. Clarinet"		3:43
2.	"Hats on Wrong"		2:47
3.	"The Hair Shirt"		4:04
4.	"Guilt Parade"	Rowland S. Howard	2:46
5.	"Riddle House"	Howard	2:47
6.	"The Friend Catcher"		4:21
7.	"Waving My Arms"	Howard	2:17
8.	"The Red Clock"	Howard	2:49
9.	"Cat Man"	Gene Vincent, Bill "Tex" Davis	2:30
10.	"Happy Birthday"	Cave, Mick Harvey, Howard	3:59
Total length:			32:00

== Personnel ==
- Nick Cave – vocals, piano
- Rowland Howard – guitar
- Mick Harvey – guitar, keyboards
- Tracy Pew – bass
- Phil Calvert – drums
