= Inbal Perlmuter =

Israeli musical artist

Inbal Perlmuter ענבל פרלמוטר

Background information
- Born: 15 January 1971; Rehovot, Israel
- Died: 1 October 1997 (aged 26) Rishon LeZion, Israel
- Genres: Rock; alternative rock
- Occupations: Singer-songwriter; guitarist; composer; lyricist
- Instruments: Vocals; guitar
- Years active: 1992–1997

Inbal Perlmuter (Hebrew: ענבל פרלמוטר; 15 January 1971 – 1 October 1997) was an Israeli singer-songwriter, guitarist, composer and lyricist, and a founding member of the band Ha-Mechashefot ("The Witches").

She began her musical career in 1992 when she founded, along with Ifat Netz and Yael Cohen, the band Ha-Mechashefot. She continued producing solo works and numerous collaborations, both in Israel and abroad.

Perlmuter died in a car accident at the age of 26.

== HaMechashefot ==
The band began to perform in clubs around Israel, and got public notice on a TV show called "Songs of the Sea of Galilee", hosted by Naomi Shemer. Ha-Mechashefot performed a sensual version of the classic song Kesem 'Al Yam Kinneret ("Magic on the Sea of Galilee") which astounded both the audience and the host. This version was recorded in April 1993, and was released as a DJ record with cover art by Perlmuter.

In early 1994, the band released its first album, Ad Ha-Oneg Ha-Ba (Till the Next Pleasure). Perlmuter wrote the lyrics and composed nearly all the songs. Thanks to Corinne Allal's arrangement and production, the band succeeded in creating an energetic guitar rock album which gained immense popularity and was certified gold. Following the album's release, the band had dozens of concerts. Some of them were held on Friday the 13th under the title "The Night of the Witches", and featured guest singers Corinne Allal and Dana Berger.

In March/April 1995, Ha-Mechashefot released its second album, Zmanim Muzarim (Strange Times). This time they arranged and produced the entire album themselves. Again, Perlmuter wrote all the lyrics and composed all but one song. The album was less popular than their first. The band continued holding concerts frequently and was a warm-up act for Björk's show in Israel.

In January 1996 Inbal and Israeli musician Ram Orion recorded in London the lo-fi album Inballance, which remained unreleased until 2016.

In April 1996, the band released its third album, Ha-Mechashefot Mitkasot (The Witches Cover Up), a collection of all the cover songs they recorded in their early days. The album included a version of Shivers on which Nick Cave participated as guest vocalist. Annie Lennox of Eurythmics had refused to allow the band's version of her song "Sweet Dreams" to be released on the album. In protest, Perlmuter distributed the song on an underground cassette; the cover, which she had designed, bore the words "Shit Rights". Perlmuter also collaborated at this time with Corinne Allal on a duet for the latter's album K'she'zeh Ammok ("When It's Deep").

After the release of this album, Ha-Mechashefot became considerably less active, although they never officially announced that they were disbanding. Their final concert was in September 1996.

A comeback concert was planned for October 2, 1997 at the Logus club in Tel Aviv. The day before the concert, Perlmuter was driving to her parents' house for a holiday dinner, when her car veered off the road and hit a small residential building at Rishon LeZion interchange. She was killed instantly. A postmortem examination found no alcohol or other drugs.

Haklatot ahronot (Last Recordings), an album of Perlmuter's preliminary recordings, was released posthumously in 1998.

== Legacy ==
The annual ACUM "Discovery of the Year" award is named in her honor.
