= HM Prison Morwell River =

Prison in Victoria, Australia 1961–1997

- Morwell River Prison late 2006

- Location in Victoria
- Location: Victoria; 38.4849°S 146.3244°E
- Status: Closed
- Security class: Minimum Security
- Capacity: 100
- Opened: 1961
- Closed: 1997
- Managed by: Corrections Victoria

A nursery and workers camp was established by the Forests Commission Victoria (FCV) in 1949 at Olsens Bridge at the head of the Morwell River, which is just east of Boolarra in Victoria.

The nursery was established to grow mountain ash seedlings for the Strzelecki Ranges reforestation scheme.

The scheme, which began in the early 1930s, ran quietly and successfully for nearly 60 years and is believed to have been the largest and most sustained reforestation project of its type in Australia.

The FCV workers camp was later to become the HM Morwell River Prison in May 1961, where up to 80 inmates worked in the nursery and planted seedlings across the Strzeleckis under the guidance of FCV employees.

The Prison was a "Minimum Security" facility and escapes occurred in 1962, 1967 and 1968.

Reputation has it that prisoners often secretly made their way to the Boolarra Hotel, and even as far as Morwell Shopping Centre. It's also rumoured the inmates brewed moonshine in the nearby bush..

Guards were, at times, not above joining prisoners in their illicit meals. On at least one occasion in 1968, staff and inmates at Morwell River Camp stole a number of sheep from a neighbour’s paddock. This misdemeanour was taken very seriously and resulted in a prosecution by the Forests Commission.

Probably its most notable inmates were media commentator Derryn Hinch in 1987, followed by prominent football umpire Harry Beitzel in 1994.

The nursery was run separately by the Forests Commission, and at it height in the mid-1970s produced in excess of one million seedlings each year.

However an internal review of the Department‘s extensive nursery operations in 1991 recommended the closure of Olsens Bridge, which ceased soon after. Seedlings were then sourced from HM Won Wron Prison nursery near Yarram.

The Morwell River Prison closed in 1997 and the remaining inmates transferred to a newly built Fulham Correctional Centre near Sale.

The prison complex was then used briefly, and unsuccessfully, as a school adventure camp but the site deteriorated quickly and became overgrown with blackberries and scrub, so that by 2006 only a few dilapidated buildings and bare concrete slabs remained visible. The land was sold in 2008.
