= Door, Door =

Studio album by The Boys Next Door
- Released: June 1979
- Recorded: June 1978; Side A recorded at Alan Eaton Studios (Melbourne); January 1979; Side B produced at Richmond Recorders
- Genres: Post-punk; punk rock; art punk
- Length: 31:56
- Label: Mushroom Records
- Producer: Les Kransky • The Boys Next Door

The Boys Next Door chronology
Door, Door (1979)	Hee Haw (1979)

Singles from Door, Door
- 1. "Shivers" Released: May 1979

Professional ratings
Review scores
Source	Rating
AllMusic	4/5 stars

Door, Door is the debut album by Australian rock band The Boys Next Door. The album was recorded before the band left Australia for London in 1980, at which point they changed their name to The Birthday Party and created the body of work for which they are most recognised. Likewise, the album is different stylistically from their later work, being less dark and slightly more poppy.

== Background ==
The band recorded a full album in June 1978 as a four-piece. Shortly afterwards, Rowland S. Howard joined as second guitarist and the group discarded half of these songs and recorded five new tracks in January 1979. These were featured on side two of the released LP (tracks 6–10 of the CD release). Of the "missing" half-album, only a demo of the song "Sex Crimes" has ever been released (in 2005).

== Legacy ==
Vocalist Nick Cave later said of the album, "We were adolescents and very late developers. There was a period where we were confused and had a lot of problems and we put out an album like Door, Door which is a product of all those things. I mean, it was a complete wet dream that record. I hate it. It reeks of a band trying to be musically intelligent and write clever, witty lyrics. It's a complete wank".

The album includes the single "Shivers" which became their best known song. Written by Howard, "Shivers" was later covered by Marie Hoy, The Screaming Jets, Divine Fits, Courtney Barnett, and others. "Shivers" was also included on the soundtrack of the 1986 film Dogs in Space, both the original Door Door version and Marie Hoy's cover.

== Track listing ==
All tracks are written by Nick Cave, except where noted.

No.	Title	Writer(s)	Length
1.	"The Nightwatchman"	Cave, Mick Harvey	2:07
2.	"Brave Exhibitions"		2:27
3.	"Friends of My World"		2:46
4.	"The Voice"		3:55
5.	"Roman Roman"		1:35
6.	"Somebody's Watching"		2:39
7.	"After a Fashion"	Rowland S. Howard	4:36
8.	"Dive Position"		2:47
9.	"I Mistake Myself"	Howard	4:31
10.	"Shivers"	Howard	4:34
Total length:			31:56

== Charts ==
Chart (1979)	Peak position
Australian (Kent Music Report)	93

== Personnel ==
The Boys Next Door

- Nick Cave – vocals
- Mick Harvey – guitar (track 1–7), piano (track 8–10)
- Rowland S. Howard – guitar (track 7–10)
- Tracy Pew – bass guitar
- Phill Calvert – drums

Additional musicians

- Chris Coyne – tenor sax
- Henry Vyhnal – violin
- Andrew Duffield – electronics

Production

- Les Karsky – producer (track 1–6)
- The Boys Next Door – producer (track 7–10)
- Tony Cohen – engineer (track 7–10)
