= Tony Cohen =

Background information
- Born: Anthony Lawrence Cohen; 4 June 1957; Melbourne, Victoria, Australia
- Died: 2 August 2017 (aged 60) Dandenong, Victoria, Australia
- Genres: Rock; glam rock; punk rock
- Occupations: Record producer; sound engineer
- Years active: 1975–2017
- Labels: Mushroom; Missing Link

Anthony Lawrence Cohen (4 June 1957 – 2 August 2017) was an Australian music record producer and sound engineer. He worked with Nick Cave's groups the Birthday Party, and then the Bad Seeds from 1979 to 2001. In mid-1986 he followed Cave to London and then onto Berlin, in January 1987, to continue to work on their material. At the ARIA Music Awards of 1994 Cohen won Producer of the Year for The Cruel Sea's second album, The Honeymoon Is Over (May 1993). At the 1995 ceremony he won Producer of the Year and Engineer of the Year for the Cruel Sea's Three Legged Dog. Cohen had been a long-term alcohol and drug user, his health deteriorated in the 2010s and he died in 2017 at Dandenong Hospital, aged 60. In November 2017 he was posthumously inducted into the Music Victoria Hall of Fame.

== Early life and education ==
Anthony Lawrence Cohen was born on 4 June 1957 in Melbourne. His father, Philip Cohen, was an Australian son of Jewish migrants from Manchester, Philip had converted to Roman Catholicism before marrying Margaret, who was an Australian of Irish descent. He grew up in suburban East Ringwood where he attended St Francis de Sales Primary School. The family moved to Mentone, along with younger brother Martin, where Cohen was enrolled at St Bede's College for his secondary education. While at Bede's he started taking drugs including marijuana/hash, amytal and LSD, which adversely affected his academic progress. Cohen started to play the drums when the family had moved to the neighbouring suburb of Cheltenham and formed a friendship with fellow aspiring drummer, Chris Thompson. He later recalled, "Neither of us were very good drummers I might admit but we shared a mutual love of music and playing."

== Career ==
Cohen, aged 15, joined a rock, glam rock band Epitaph on drums for a year. He bought a four-track recorder to tape their work and then recorded other local groups. During school holidays in mid-1973 he spent two weeks doing work experience at Armstrong Studios. His friend Thompson went along for a day and they decided on a career in the recording studio. After work experience he refused to return to school but continued at the studios, "No one said anything, so I stayed." For two years he was a "shit-kicker", and started by, "cleaning the toilets and getting the lunches and stuff, and then got promoted to mono dubbing boy." By 1975 Cohen began working as a sound engineer under the guidance of Roger Savage. In April of the following year he was working as an assistant record producer, alongside Molly Meldrum, on Perth's glam rock group, Supernaut's lead single, "I Like It Both Ways" (May 1976). Cohen produced the group's associated self-titled album, which appeared in November of that year, and its follow-up single, "Too Hot to Touch" (September).

In July 1976, Cohen and fellow engineer, Ian MacKenzie, met with Meldrum to organise the production of the pop group, the Ferrets' debut album, Dreams of a Love: "It was all a bit of Elton John, a bit of the 'Real Thing', [Meldrum] called us in for a production meeting 9:00 in the morning at his place and he was still in bed [...] and putting the music on [...] very, very loud and then proceeds to shout at you over the top of it, and we were all sitting there sort of terrified thinking, what on earth is he saying?" After a year production was still incomplete so the Ferrets took over, together with Cohen and MacKenzie assisting. It was finalised in August 1977 and released in October with Meldrum credited as Willie Everfinish.

In June 1978, Cohen started working with the Boys Next Door (later renamed the Birthday Party), as an engineer at Richmond Recorders on their debut album, Door, Door (1979). He then engineered the Birthday Party's early extended play, Hee Haw (December 1979). Next he was the engineer and producer, on their second album, The Birthday Party (November 1980). He was the engineer and producer for their third album, Junkyard (May 1982), which was listed in the book, 100 Best Australian Albums at number 17. Cohen told the authors that he was directed, "Forget all the bottom end and the rich, lush sounds. Make it sound like trash." He continued as engineer and/or producer for the group's leader, Nick Cave, in the related group, Nick Cave and the Bad Seeds. From From Her to Eternity (18 June 1984) to No More Shall We Part (2 April 2001). Cohen followed the group to London in mid-1986 and then on to Berlin in January 1987 to continue to work with Cave. He returned to Melbourne in January 1988 with his drug habit "spiraling out of control."

Cohen reflected on his early work with Cave, in an interview with Richard Fidler in September 2006, "[it] was all very experimental then, because we were all learning – I fell in love with this new way of recording... because there were no rules. We were looking for sounds that made your fillings drop out rather than pleasant pop tunes, so we got to do crazy things like find concrete stairwells and abuse equipment, so it was all very attractive for me. Some of it didn't work, but as history has shown Nick really honed his craft, he's done some brilliant records... some of the early stuff was a bit rough but it was a learning curve then." Ed Nimmervoll, an Australian music journalist and editor of Rock Australia Magazine, recalled "Nick Cave's Birthday Party were allowed to take up some of the studio time slack. Rather than [go] home, their producer Tony Cohen slept in the air conditioning duct."

A long-term working relationship had also been established with Tex Perkins, starting with the singer's alternative rock group, Beasts of Bourbon's 1984 album, The Axeman's Jazz. Cohen had engineered and produced it during a single eight-hour session at Paradise Studios in Sydney, in October of the previous year, with label boss Roger Grierson as executive producer. According to Australian musicologist, Ian McFarlane, "Legend has it that the session was fuelled by 72 cans of beer and one bottle of Scotch, and that it only ended when the band members began passing out!" He produced their next studio album, The Low Road, (December 1991). In the following year he was their engineer, producer and mixer for a five-track EP, Just Right, which had been recorded live at the Prince of Wales Hotel in May 1991 by Cohen's childhood friend, Chris Thompson.

Cohen's services were used for Perkins' next band the Cruel Sea on their second studio album, This Is Not the Way Home (October 1991). He was nominated at the ARIA Music Awards of 1993 for Producer of the Year for that album and for "Get Thee to a Nunnery", a track on TISM's EP, The Beasts of Suburban (20 July 1992). He worked for an ad hoc country blues trio of Perkins, Don Walker and Charlie Owen, as Tex, Don and Charlie on their debut album, Sad But True (November 1993). While recording that album he was interviewed in the studio by Kerry Negara, the director of SBS-TV's Nomad. At the following year's ARIA Awards ceremony he won Producer of the Year for the Cruel Sea's third album, The Honeymoon Is Over (May 1993).

In 1995, he won both Engineer of the Year and Producer of the Year. Over the previous 18 months – the eligibility period – Cohen had produced Let Love In (Nick Cave and the Bad Seeds, 18 April 1994), You Wanna Be There But You Don't Wanna Travel (Dave Graney 'n' the Coral Snakes, June 1994), Parables for Wooden Ears (Powderfinger, 18 July 1994), Livin' Lazy (Maurice Frawley and Working Class Ringos, 1994), Three Legged Dog (the Cruel Sea, April 1995), Kim Salmon and the Surrealists (Kim Salmon and the Surrealists, April 1995) and Mouth to Mouth (the Blackeyed Susans, July 1995).

In the 2000s, Cohen's name started appearing less regularly on album credits. During 2003, he worked as a remix engineer on Nick Cave and the Bad Seeds' old master tapes for Stephen Petronio's contemporary dance work, Underland. Cave was unable to provide new tracks for the project due to time conflicts but allowed his material to be used. Cohen had effectively retired in 2004–2005. He emerged in 2017 to produce Augie March's album Bootikins, as he had always wanted to work with the group. He died unexpectedly before the album's sessions concluded, and Augie March leader Glenn Richards stated "It still amazes me that we got a chance to work with the man. The moments are ours and we will cherish them ... He got us feeling like and playing like a real band again after a long interim, and we made some very good music together." In November 2017 Cohen was posthumously inducted into the Music Victoria Hall of Fame. A memoir of his life, Half Deaf, Completely Mad, was published by John Olson in November 2023.

== Personal life ==
Tony Cohen had an on-again off-again relationship with Joanne from mid-1981, she had been Chris Thompson's girlfriend when they met. They lived together initially in Elsternwick, then Sydney and back, again. His drug habit now included amphetamine and heroin. By early 1983 Cohen was also dating a different woman, Josephine, whom he married on 28 May 1983, in Melbourne. According to his brother, "I don't think Tony ever had a distinct line between dumping one girl and getting on with another." The couple moved to Sydney in late 1983 and then back to Melbourne in July of the following year. Cohen and Josephine relocated to London in mid-1986 before they separated (and later divorced). He then moved to Berlin in January 1987, and returned to Australian early in the next year.

Early in 1991, Cohen began a relationship with Astrid Munday, a vocalist for country music groups Killer Sheep and then Desert Boot. After living together in Sydney they moved in with Cohen's parents at their rural property at Kongwak, Victoria in November 1991. At different times he attempted to curb his alcohol and drug dependencies. The couple returned to Melbourne in February 1992. Cohen had earlier been diagnosed with hepatitis C, then pancreatitis (September 1992) and diabetes (October). At the ARIA Music Awards of 1995 he had a hypoglycaemic event, "just as they announced my name so I was in the suit and everything and sweat was just dripping off me so I had to go and hide up the back and Molly was standing on the seat going 'Where are you? Tony, where are you?' So it wasn't a great memory for me... I couldn't get up on stage and make a speech... you know, my blood sugar had dropped and I was a mess; such a shame."

In late 2000, Cohen and Munday moved to London, where he worked on No More Shall We Part (April 2001) for Nick Cave and the Bad Seeds, while Munday worked as a temporary teacher. By that stage Cohen's diabetes was worsening and his studio attendances became erratic. After the recording sessions ended he struggled to get further work in London and so returned to Melbourne. By 2004 or 2005 he was in semi-retirement, "In a bid to rid himself of a renewed taste for drugs and to revive his ailing health."

His health continued to deteriorate into the 2010s. Tony Cohen died on 2 August 2017 at Dandenong Hospital, aged 60. Although no cause of death was reported, his sibling recalled, "Tony lived a hard life with drugs and alcohol playing a big part of his professional career. He did give them up many years ago but always knew that he would eventually pay for his 'sins'." Conversely, "we were like chalk and cheese. But, I loved him and fully respect what he achieved in his career. He was technically brilliant, but also a caring, big-hearted man." Upon the inclusion of Cohen's work in the Australian Music Vault, his mother Margaret stated, "it wasn't until his untimely death, that I was made aware of the esteem that he was held in by so many people. I am proud of his contribution to the rock and roll music industry here and all that he achieved through his life." A suitcase of cassette tapes he used as back-ups of recordings was donated to the vault. Munday released an album with material dedicated to her husband, Beauty in the Ordinary, in August 2020.

== Technical works ==
List of technical works by Tony Cohen including audio engineer, record producer or mixer.

Year	Artist(s)	Work	Role(s)	Ref.
1976	Supernaut	Supernaut	Engineer, producer	
1977	The Ferrets	Dreams of a Love	Engineer, assistant producer	
1978	The Ferrets	Fame at any Price	Engineer, producer	
1978	Various Artists	Wildlife (soundtrack)	Engineer, producer	
1979	The Boys Next Door	Door, Door	Engineer	
1979	The Birthday Party	Hee Haw (EP)	Engineer	
1980	The Birthday Party	The Birthday Party	Engineer, producer	
1980	James Freud	Breaking Silence	Producer	
1980	Models	Alphabravocharliedeltaechofoxtrotgolf	Engineer, producer	
1981	The Birthday Party	Prayers on Fire	Engineer, producer	
1981	The Zorros	"Too Young", "Let Me Love You" (single)	Producer	
1981	Models	Cut Lunch	Producer	
1981	The Go-Betweens	Send Me a Lullaby	Engineer, producer	
1981	Serious Young Insects	"Trouble Understanding Words" (single)	Producer	
1982	Hunters & Collectors	World of Stone (EP) "Hammer the Hammer" (single)	Engineer, producer	
1982	The Birthday Party	Junkyard	Engineer, producer	
1982	Hunters & Collectors	Hunters & Collectors	Engineer	
1982	Tuff Monks	"After the Fireworks" (single)	Producer	
1982	Pel Mel	Out of Reason	Engineer, producer	
1983	The Moodists	Engine Shudder (EP)	Producer	
1983	The Birthday Party	The Bad Seed (EP)	Producer	
1983	The Reels	Pitt Street Farmers (EP)	Producer	
1983	Pel Mel	Persuasion	Producer	
1983	The Birthday Party	Mutiny! (EP)	Producer	
1984	Nick Cave and the Bad Seeds	From Her to Eternity	Engineer	
1984	Sacred Cowboys	Sacred Cowboys (EP)	Producer	
1984	Pel Mel	O.D.R.	Producer	
1984	The Beasts of Bourbon	The Axeman's Jazz	Producer	
1984	Cold Chisel	Twentieth Century	Engineer	
1984	The Olympic Sideburns	"13th Floor" (single)	Producer	
1984	The Spaniards	"God Is a Shield" (single)	Producer	
1985	Sacred Cowboys	We Love You... Of Course We Do	Producer	
1985	X	At Home with You	Engineer	
1986	Nick Cave and the Bad Seeds	Kicking Against the Pricks	Engineer, producer	
1986	Crime & the City Solution	Room of Lights	Producer	
1986	Nick Cave and the Bad Seeds	Your Funeral... My Trial	Engineer, producer	
1987	Jeremy Gluck	I Knew Buffalo Bill	Producer	
1987	Lolitas	Series Américaines	Engineer, producer	
1988	Nick Cave and the Bad Seeds	Tender Prey	Engineer, mixer, producer	
1988	Sacred Cowboys	Trouble from Providence	Producer	
1988	Crime & the City Solution	Shine	Producer	
1988	Wild Pumpkins at Midnight	Wild Pumpkins at Midnight	Producer	
1989	Phil Shöenfelt	Charlotte's Room (EP)	Producer	
1991	The Beasts of Bourbon	The Low Road	Producer	
1991	The Cruel Sea	This Is Not the Way Home	Producer, engineer	
1992	Nick Cave and the Bad Seeds	Henry's Dream	Engineer, mixer	
1992	Falling Joys	Psychohum	Producer	
1992	TISM	"Get Thee to a Nunnery"	Producer	
1992	Mixed Relations	T.I.O.L.I. (EP) "Take It or Leave It" (single)	Producer	
1992	Straitjacket Fits	Done	Producer	
1992	These Immortal Souls	I'm Never Gonna Die Again	Producer	
1993	Wild Pumpkins at Midnight	Sick	Producer	
1993	Mixed Relations	"Love" (single)	Producer	
1993	Dave Graney 'n' the Coral Snakes	Night of the Wolverine	Producer	
1993	Things of Stone and Wood	The Yearning	Mixing	
1993	Kim Salmon and the Surrealists	Sin Factory	Producer	
1993	Tiddas	Sing About Life	Producer	
1993	Tex, Don and Charlie	Sad but True	Producer	
1993	Anita Lane	Dirty Pearl	Engineer, mixer	
1994	Nick Cave and the Bad Seeds	Let Love In	Engineer, mixer, producer	
1994	Dave Graney 'n' the Coral Snakes	You Wanna Be There But You Don't Wanna Travel	Producer	
1994	Powderfinger	Parables for Wooden Ears	Producer	
1994	Paul Kelly	Wanted Man	Engineer	
1994	Maurice Frawley and Working Class Ringos	Livin' Lazy	Producer	
1995	The Cruel Sea	Three Legged Dog	Engineer, producer	
1995	Kim Salmon and the Surrealists	Kim Salmon and the Surrealists	Producer	
1995	The Blackeyed Susans	Mouth to Mouth	Engineer, mixer, producer	
1995	Mick Harvey	Intoxicated Man	Engineer, producer	
1995	Louis Tillett and Charlie Owen	Midnight Rain	Producer	
1995	Hugo Race & The True Spirit	Valley of Light	Mixer, producer	
1996	Nick Cave and the Bad Seeds	Murder Ballads	Mixer, producer	
1996	The Bhagavad Guitars	Introversion/Extroversion	Engineer, producer	
1996	Wild Pumpkins at Midnight	Sad Trees	Producer	
1996	Frenzal Rhomb	Not So Tough Now	Producer	
1996	Various Artists	Scream: Music from the Dimension Motion Picture (soundtrack)	Producer	
1996	Delicatessen	Hustle into Bed	Producer	
1997	Wild Pumpkins at Midnight	The Secret of the Sad Tree	Producer	
1997	Mick Harvey	Pink Elephants	Engineer, mixer, producer	
1998	Astrid Munday	Astrid Munday	Producer	
1998	Working Class Ringoes	Working Class Ringoes	Producer	
2000	Astrid Munday	Apparition	Mixer, producer	
2000	Tex Perkins	Dark Horses	Producer	
2001	Nick Cave and the Bad Seeds	No More Shall We Part	Engineer, mixer, producer	
2002	The Chucky Monroes	Fallen Angel	Producer	
2002	Rosie Westbrook	Wave	Producer	
2003	Nick Cave	Underland	Remix engineer	
2006	Astrid Munday	Sunshine and Promises	Mixer, producer	
2006	Souls on Board	Souls on Board (EP)	Mixer, producer	
2006	Muzza Monroe and the Lushous Strings	In Your Hand	Producer	
2008	Fur Patrol	Local Kid	Producer	
2018	Augie March	Bootikins	Producer	

== Awards and nominations ==
Four albums which Cohen worked on are listed in the book, 100 Best Australian Albums (2010): the Birthday Party's Junkyard (May 1982) at No. 17, the Cruel Sea's The Honeymoon Is Over (May 1993) at No. 63, Nick Cave and the Bad Seeds' Tender Prey (September 1988) at No. 83, and Tex, Don and Charlie's Sad But True (November 1993) at No. 84.

=== ARIA Music Awards ===
Year	Nominee / work	Award	Result	Ref.
1993	The Cruel Sea – This Is Not the Way Home; TISM – "Get Thee to a Nunnery	Producer of the Year	Nominated	
1994	The Cruel Sea – The Honeymoon Is Over	Producer of the Year	Won	
1995	himself, Paul McKercher – The Cruel Sea – Three Legged Dog	Engineer of the Year	Won	
1995	himself – The Cruel Sea – Three Legged Dog	Producer of the Year	Won	

=== Music Victoria Awards ===
The Music Victoria Awards are an annual awards night celebrating Victorian music. They commenced in 2006.

Year	Nominee / work	Award	Result	Ref.
2017	Tony Cohen	Hall of Fame	inducted	
