= HM Prison Won Wron =

Minimum-security reforestation camp

- Location in Victoria
- Location: Won Wron, Victoria; 38°29′8″S 146°40′19″E
- Status: Closed
- Security class: Minimum security
- Capacity: 127
- Opened: 1964
- Closed: 2004
- Managed by: Corrections Victoria

HM Prison Won Wron was a minimum security prison located at Won Wron near Yarram in Victoria.

In 1962/63, a group of prisoners and prison officers from HM Prison Morwell River began construction of the HM Prison Won Wron.

The facility was associated with a Forests Commission Victoria (FCV) nursery to raise pine seedlings for the Strzelecki Ranges reforestation scheme, although no prison labour was available for forests work until 1968.

Eucalypt seedlings were produced at a similar FCV nursery at Olsens Bridge near Boolara which was associated with HM Prison Morwell River. The Olsens Bridge nursery operated until 1991 when operations transferred to Won Wron.

Soon after in 1993, the Victorian Plantations Corporation was formed and transferred its nursery operations to an expanded facility at nearby Gelliondale.

The Prison was noteworthy in that it held an annual fun-run on Easter Sunday with the tongue-in-cheek name of "Prisoners on the Run", which raised funds to help support disabled and disadvantaged children in the Gippsland area.

HM Prison Won Wron closed in late 2004 and the subsequent proposal to set up an Indigenous rehabilitation facility on the site was opposed by the local community of Yarram.

The site reopened in 2008 as the Wulgunggo Ngalu Learning Place, a culturally appropriate learning place that houses and supports up to 18 Koori men who are undertaking Community Correction Orders. It won the community corrections category of the 2010 International Corrections and Prisons Association (ICPA) awards.
