= Prayers on Fire =

Studio album by the Birthday Party
- Released: 6 April 1981
- Recorded: December 1980 – January 1981
- Studios: A.A.V. Studio 2 and Richmond Recorders, Melbourne, Australia
- Genre: Post-punk
- Length: 36:06
- Label: Missing Link
- Producers: Tony Cohen, the Birthday Party

The Birthday Party chronology
The Birthday Party (1980)	Prayers on Fire (1981)	Drunk on the Pope's Blood (1982)

Singles from Prayers on Fire
- 1. "Nick the Stripper" Released: 1981

Prayers on Fire is the debut studio album by Australian rock group the Birthday Party, released on 6 April 1981 on the Missing Link label in Australia, later licensed to the 4AD label. This was the band's first full-length release on an international record label and the first after changing the group's name from the Boys Next Door to the Birthday Party. It was recorded at Armstrong's Audio Visual Studios in Melbourne and Richmond Recorders in the nearby suburb of Richmond, between December 1980 and January 1981.

== Background ==
In February 1980 Melbourne-based new wave group, the Boys Next Door, changed their name to the Birthday Party. They consisted of the same lineup of Phill Calvert on drums, Nick Cave on vocals, Mick Harvey on guitar and organ, Rowland S. Howard on guitar and Tracy Pew on bass guitar. They relocated to London and signed with the 4AD label which issued the extended play, The Friend Catcher in the United Kingdom. In July, their Australian label, Missing Link Records, released "Mr Clarinet" from the EP as a single. In November, Missing Link released the album, The Birthday Party / The Boys Next Door, which combined previously unreleased material with tracks that has been issued under the Boys Next Door name.

Also in November 1980, the Birthday Party returned to Australia and toured. According to Australian music historian, Ian McFarlane, "It was during this time that the band cemented its reputation as a peerless live act, with its omnipresent influence settling over the Melbourne scene". On 6 April 1981 they issued the album and followed in June with its lead single, "Nick the Stripper". The group returned to London.

Members of Melbourne post-punk band Equal Local contributed the brass section to "Nick the Stripper" – tenor saxophonist Mick Hauser was mis-credited as "Mick Hunter". Equal Local had formed in 1980 by Dean Richards on guitar, Philip Jackson on synthesisers, trumpet and rhythm generator, Melissa Webb on synthesiser and piano, Bryce Perrin on acoustic bass, and Hauser. Richards and Jackson were bandmates from the post-punk group Whirlywirld and contemporaries of the Boys Next Door. Equal Local disbanded in early 1982.

== Composition and recording ==
In Melbourne, in December 1980 and January 1981, they joined engineer and producer, Tony Cohen, in Armstrong's Audio Visual Studios (A.A.V. Studio 2) and Richmond Recorders, to record their tracks. Music journalist Toby Creswell noted that the band "struggled with creating their own identity some of them also began indulging an appetite for alcohol and heroin". Cave was embarrassed by "Zoo Music Girl" but noted "we were digging for something and we kind of just found it with some songs" and cited "King Ink" as an example of "a certain kind of sound that we wanted to work with on records after that". Eight of the eleven tracks on Prayers on Fire were written or co-written by Cave, "[it] was a kind of reaction to the major disappointments we felt when we went to England... [we] began to see a vision and I don't think we were positively influenced ... we didn't want to be like the English New Wave pop groups of the time". Pew observed "[it] stinks, quite honestly ... The engineer slept through the entire session for a start".

== Reception ==
Professional ratings
Review scores
Source	Rating
About.com	4/5 stars
AllMusic	4/5 stars
The Austin Chronicle	4/5 stars
The Encyclopedia of Popular Music	3/5 stars
The Great Rock Discography	8/10
MusicHound Rock	4.5/5 stars
Ondarock	8/10
Record Mirror	4/5 stars
The Rolling Stone Album Guide	3/5 stars
Spin Alternative Record Guide	9/10

About.com's Anthony Carew felt Prayers on Fire was able to "capture the qualities of their infamous live-shows on record ... the evocatively-produced set dared dress key cuts in blaring brass; giving a sense of perverted-cabaret to their mordant racket, turning Cave from nihilist, self-destructive savant to theatrical, flamboyant showman". AllMusic's Greg Maurer found "a fascination with the dark, (self-)destructive side of religion is more than evident in his later work... While there might not be any of the explicit Biblical imagery on [the album] that Cave would later ejaculate, the title ... is apt". Ian McFarlane stated it showed the band was "irrevocably and unashamedly changing for the better, being more aggressive than anything they had ever recorded". SoundStageDirect described it as "a creepy carnival of tribal rhythms, wonky discordance and garbled surrealism". Music critic Ed St John summarised, "this is an expression which ebbs out beyond the confines of proficiently played music ... [it] is akin to watching a film of Jackson Pollock painting or listening to Dylan Thomas in full alcoholic flight".

The track "Ho-Ho" is featured in the 2004 German film Head-On.

=== Accolades ===
Publication/Source	Country	Accolade	Year	Rank
Neil Strauss	US	The 100 Most Influential Alternative Albums	1993	-
Sounds	UK	The Top 80 Albums from the '80s	1989	43
The Guardian	UK	1000 Albums to Hear Before You Die	2007	-
Uncut	UK	The 100 Greatest Debut Albums	2006	93
Uncut	UK	The Ultimate Record Collection - The 1980s	2018	-
Rockdelux	Spain	The 100 Best Albums of the 1980s	1990	57
Rolling Stone Australia	Australia	The 100 Greatest Albums of the 80s	1990	33
Triple J	Australia	Hottest 100 Australian Albums	2015	66
Paste	US	The 50 Best Post-Punk Albums	2016	37
PopMatters	US	The 50 Best Post-Punk Albums Ever	2017	41

== Track listing ==
No.	Title	Lyrics	Music by	Length
1.	"Zoo-Music Girl"	Nick Cave	Rowland S. Howard	2:38
2.	"Cry"	Cave	Cave	2:42
3.	"Capers"	Genevieve McGuckin	Howard	2:39
4.	"Nick the Stripper"	Cave	Cave	3:52
5.	"Ho-Ho"	Howard	McGuckin	3:07
6.	"Figure of Fun"	Cave	Cave, Howard	2:48
7.	"King Ink"	Cave	Cave, Howard	4:41
8.	"A Dead Song"	Anita Lane	Cave	2:13
9.	"Yard"	Cave	Cave	5:04
10.	"Dull Day"	Howard	Howard	3:04
11.	"Just You and Me"	Cave	Mick Harvey	2:03
Total length:				36:06

CD reissue bonus tracks
No.	Title	Lyrics	Music by	Length
12.	"Blundertown"	Howard	Howard	3:10
13.	"Kathy's Kisses"	Cave	Cave	4:05

== Personnel ==
The Birthday Party members

- Nick Cave – lead vocals, piano (track 7), saxophone (track 9), drums (track 11)
- Rowland S. Howard – guitar, backing vocals, lead vocals (track 5), saxophone (track 11)
- Mick Harvey – organ, piano, guitar, snare drum (track 7),
- Tracy Pew – bass guitar, clarinet (track 8), double bass (track 9)
- Phill Calvert – drums

Equal Local members on "Nick the Stripper"

- Phillip Jackson – trumpet
- Mick Hauser – tenor saxophone (incorrectly credited as "Mick Hunter")
- Stephen Ewart – trombone

Recording details

- Producer – Tony Cohen, the Birthday Party
- Engineer – Tony Cohen
- Studios – Armstrong's Audio Visual Studios (tracks 1–5, 7–9, 12–13), Richmond Recorders (tracks 6, 10, 11)
  - Mixing studios – Armstrong's Audio Visual Studios (tracks 6, 10, 11)

Art work

- Photography – Jenny, Polly Borland, Evan English (cover photo)

== Chart positions ==
Chart (1981)	Peak position
Australian Albums (Kent Music Report)	96
UK Independent Albums (Record Business)	4
