= Mutiny/The Bad Seed =

Compilation album by the Birthday Party
- Released: original EPs: 1983 compilation album: 1989
- Recorded: October 1982, April & August 1983
- Genre: Post-punk
- Length: 39:44
- Label: 4AD

The Birthday Party chronology
Junkyard (1982)	Mutiny/The Bad Seed (1983)	Hee Haw (1989)

The Bad Seed album artwork

Professional ratings
Review scores
Source	Rating
AllMusic	4/5 stars
The Austin Chronicle	3/5 stars
Oxford Reference	very favorable
The New Rolling Stone Album Guide	4/5 stars

Mutiny/The Bad Seed is a compilation album by the Birthday Party. It is compiled from 2 EPs, The Bad Seed recorded in October 1982, and Mutiny! recorded in April and August 1983, and both were released in 1983. The Bad Seed and Mutiny! were released as a compilation in 1989. It is written by Nick Cave, Mick Harvey, Rowland S. Howard, and Tracy Pew.

These are the band's final studio recordings, and the only studio recordings made after the departure of drummer Phill Calvert. The album marks the first collaboration with Cave's longtime collaborator Blixa Bargeld, who played guitar on "Mutiny in Heaven". The compilation adds two tracks not included on the Mutiny EP, "Pleasure Avalanche" and "Six Strings That Drew Blood," the latter later re-recorded by the Bad Seeds.

== The Bad Seed ==
With all the songs featuring co-writes from Cave and Harvey, it was said The Bad Seed, "forecasts the imminent future of Cave as a solo artist and Harvey as his right-hand man in more than just title." Howard's guitar work on the E.P. was particularly praised. The song "Deep in the Woods", "ends in all on a perfectly outrageous note, with Cave at his most sepulchral conjuring up a rural scene of devastation. The delivery and lyrics redefine the phrase "over the top.""

Clinton Walker said the recording was, "the definitive Birthday Party record, a cauldron of narrative neo-blues songs devastating for its malignant sparseness." Trouser Press called it, "four concise cuts of incredible visceral impact. It leaves the listener helpless and enthralled."

Harvey later said, "People didn't mention the blues thing until The Bad Seeds. But there was a lot of it in the later Birthday Party, The Bad Seed. Maybe that was due to me, co-writing the songs with Nick. But then, I don't really listen to the blues. It wasn't until later, in the mid-eighties, that Nick was listening to a bit of John Lee Hooker."

Despite having minimal song-writing credits on the E.P., Howard said, "I think, basically, Bad Seed is a lot more focused. When we kicked out Phill everything fell into place quickly. Like, I think Mick is far more capable of expressing himself on the drums than on the guitar. It was like everyone pushing for one aim, to create the same type of atmosphere."

The cover of the E.P. was designed by Cave using photos taken by Bleddyn Butcher. The art around the pictures of the four members of the band was in the shape of a swastika. Harvey later said, "It always amazed me that people didn't get that. It was just a belly laugh for us. Hansa Studios, where we recorded it, was right near the wall and used to be a Nazi ballroom. The ghost of the Nazi era was so powerful in Berlin in the early eighties."

== Mutiny! ==
The initial recordings for Mutiny! took place at Hansa, where they had recorded The Bad Seed, but after an Australian tour (minus Mick Harvey) they continued in London.

Trouser Press said that "the posthumous Mutiny! was released at the correct time: it wouldn't have been easy to follow. Like The Bad Seed, it mixes two furious numbers with a pair of funereal dirges. 'Jennifer's Veil', a harrowing lament, is perhaps the band's finest song ever – neither John Cale nor Alfred Hitchcock was ever this scary." AllMusic claimed, "the group bowed out with artistic extremism intact, if not always exploding all over the place as in years past."

The cover art was conceived by Cave and Anita Lane, but constructed by Cave alone.

Cave later declared the recording, "a documentary of the group in utter collapse. The four songs are utterly dissimilar to each other because we all knew it was the last record and there was no longer any union within the group. It's not like we reached a point where we couldn't get any better. I just think we dissolved mid-climb". Cave claimed there were tensions within the band at the recording sessions. "I knew that I wasn't getting along creatively with Rowland Howard, but we were still friends. There were different conflicts but it's kind of hard to put my finger on what they were now", he said.

Howard described the recording process as "a nightmare. I'd done four or five hours of guitar overdubs, I'd worked out three or four completely different things which I played over a very skeletal track. I'd play one which would be rejected by Nick ad infinitum". Recording later continued without Howard's knowledge, with Blixa Bargeld completing the guitar track on "Mutiny in Heaven". Bargeld said, "It was manifestly obvious that Rowland and Nick didn't get on anymore. Nick just wanted me to play guitar on Rowland's guitar and amp set up. That's what I remember. I didn't delve into the psychological situation".

German director Heiner Mühlenbrock filmed the recording of "Jennifer's Veil" and "Swampland" for his documentary "Die Stadt" (The city) which also featured Cave. However, the footage remained unused and was only released briefly as an unofficial DVD-R via a Birthday Party fansite.

== Track listing ==
=== The Bad Seed E.P. ===
No.	Title	Writer(s)	Length
1.	"Sonny's Burning"	Cave, Harvey, Howard, Pew	3:20
2.	"Wild World"	Cave, Harvey	3:26
3.	"Fears of Gun"	Cave, Harvey	3:53
4.	"Deep in the Woods"	Cave, Harvey	4:49

=== The "Mutiny" Sessions ===
No.	Title	Writer(s)	Length
1.	"Jennifer's Veil"	Cave, Howard	4:56
2.	"Six Strings That Drew Blood"	Cave, Howard	3:32
3.	"Say a Spell"	Howard	3:41
4.	"Swampland"	Cave, Harvey, Howard, Pew	3:29
5.	"Pleasure Avalanche"	Cave	4:22
6.	"Mutiny in Heaven"	Cave, Harvey	4:16

== Personnel ==
The Birthday Party

- Nick Cave − vocals
- Mick Harvey − drums, guitar
- Rowland S. Howard − guitar
- Tracy Pew − bass

Additional musician

- Blixa Bargeld – guitar (on "Mutiny in Heaven")

Production

- BilBo (Denis Blackham) – The Bad Seed mastering
- Laurence Stevens – The Bad Seed graphics
- Bleddyn Butcher – The Bad Seed photography
- Anita Lane – Mutiny cover design
