= Release the Bats =

Single by The Birthday Party
- B-side: "Blast Off"
- Released: 31 July 1981
- Recorded: 1981; (Townhouse Studios, London)
- Genre: Gothic rock
- Length: 4:51
- Label: 4AD
- Songwriters: Nick Cave; Mick Harvey
- Producers: The Birthday Party; Nick Launay

The Birthday Party singles chronology
"Nick the Stripper" (1981)	"Release the Bats" (1981)	"Dead Joe" (1982)

"Release the Bats" is a song by Australian post-punk band The Birthday Party. Written by Nick Cave and Mick Harvey, the song was released as a single on 31 July 1981 through 4AD record label, with the B-side "Blast Off". The recordings were produced by the band and Nick Launay. The single charted on UK Indie Chart, peaking at number 3.

Achieving a cult status following its release, the title track became influential on the then-emerging gothic rock genre. The tracks off the single were later featured on the CD reissues of the band's final album, Junkyard (1982), as bonus tracks. It also appeared on the genre compilation album Silhouettes and Statues.

== Background and recording ==
"Release the Bats" became a highlight of the Birthday Party's live set in early 1981 and was recorded for a John Peel session. The track and its B-side were recorded on the same night with a session at the Townhouse Studios with producer Nick Launay, who was commissioned by 4AD because of his work on Public Image Ltd's Flowers of Romance (1981). Launay managed to book cheap studio time in Studio Two after midnight only, as the daytime session on the studio was occupied by Phil Collins. Launay recalled: "They walked in looking like they hadn't slept in days, all smartly dressed in black like they had just come from church but maybe the church was a ruin with rats, and they hadn't washed in weeks... The term goth did not exist at that time, certainly not in the way we would use it these days, but I will say that recording a song called 'Release The Bats' with people who looked like vampires was pretty fucking exciting!"

The sessions were dominated by guitarists Mick Harvey and Rowland S. Howard. During the recording of the vocals of the B-side "Blast Off," they insisted vocalist Nick Cave redo the middle section of the track many times as a prank, until Cave was out of breath and nearly collapsed. The band ended up using the first take with the advice of Launay. As a means of retaliation, Launay equalized the guitar tracks with a huge amount of mid-range after they requested that the guitars sound the way a bee sting feels. He also ran them through two more graphic equalizers and cut out all the low end, creating the abrasive and distorted sound of the track. During the rest of the recording, the band members regularly disappeared to the bathroom, which according to Launay "added to the fuel and edginess of the night," and notable arguments broke out, mainly aiming at drummer Phill Calvert.

According to Harvey, the title track was conceived as "a comedic interlude" and was recorded "because it happened almost by accident."

== Music and lyrics ==
AllMusic's Amy Hanson categorized the track as a "deep rolling bass-led cacophony," while Sasha Frere-Jones of New Yorker argued that its "rhythm section vamps around a menacing bass figure while the guitar lurches back and forth, unsure of whether to make noise or form chords." Cave’s barely comprehensible yowling vocals on the track also contrasts with "the ominous baritone with which he’s now indelibly associated."

Lyrically, the song was meant to be a self-parody, caricaturing the band's gothic associations. The title and lyrics of the track employs typical gothic themes, with attacking phrases such as "sex horror sex bat sex sex horror sex vampire sex bat horror vampire sex."

== Reception and legacy ==
AllMusic critic Amy Hanson described the track as "the quintessential Birthday Party song," stating: "The song's title alone ensured that "Release the Bats" became a mantra for the gothic generation as vampires, blood, and biting were so popular with the caped crowd." The song formed a basis for the gothic rock genre, which was later dismissed by Cave.

NME listed the track as number 7 on its list of "The 20 Greatest Goth Tracks." The single was also featured on Fact magazine's list of "20 best: Goth records ever made" as number 5.

== Track listing ==
A-side

1. "Release the Bats" (Cave, Harvey) – 2:32

B-side

1. "Blast Off" (Howard) – 2:19

== Personnel ==
The Birthday Party

- Nick Cave – vocals
- Mick Harvey – guitar, keyboards
- Tracy Pew – bass guitar
- Phill Calvert – drums
- Rowland S. Howard – guitar

Technical personnel

- The Birthday Party – production
- Nick Launay – production
- Bilbo – mastering

== Charts ==
Chart (1981)	Peak position
UK Indie Chart	3
