= Junkyard (album) =

Studio album by the Birthday Party
- Released: 10 July 1982
- Recorded: 1981–1982
- Studios: A.A.V. Studio 2, Melbourne, Australia and Matrix Studios, London, England
- Genres: Post-punk; punk blues
- Length: 47:17 (CD); 39:18 (LP)
- Label: Missing Link
- Producers: Richard Mazda, Tony Cohen, Nick Launay

The Birthday Party chronology
Drunk on the Pope's Blood (1982)	Junkyard (1982)	Mutiny/The Bad Seed (1983)

Singles from Junkyard
- 1. "Dead Joe" Released: 1982

Junkyard is the second and final studio album by Australian post-punk group the Birthday Party. It was released on 10 July 1982 through the label 4AD in the UK and through Missing Link Records in Australia. It was the group's last full-length studio recording. It has received critical acclaim.

== Background ==
Junkyard was inspired by American Southern Gothic imagery, dealing with extreme subjects like an evangelist's murdered daughter. Anita Lane, then girlfriend of lead singer Nick Cave, co-wrote two songs for the album: "Dead Joe" and "Kiss Me Black".

The album was a transitional record for a variety of reasons. On 16 February 1982 in Melbourne, Tracy Pew (the band's bass player) was arrested for drunk driving. For this and several other outstanding offences he served 2.5 months in HM Prison Won Wron in Australia, and so Barry Adamson played bass on one track. In addition to his usual guitar, Mick Harvey played drums on a few songs, anticipating the upcoming departure of founding member Phill Calvert and the group's subsequent switch from quintet to quartet.

== Recording and artwork ==
The album was recorded with Tony Cohen at Armstrong's Audio Visual (A.A.V.) Studios in Melbourne in December 1981 and January 1982. Additional tracks were recorded in London's Matrix Studios with producer Richard Mazda in March 1982. Mazda's previous work with Alternative TV and the Fall had brought him to their attention.

Cohen said he was approached by Cave and Harvey before the recording. They felt the previous album had been a "slick and pleasant, Little River Band record" and they wanted the new record to "sound like trash. A scratchy, trebly sound." Unlike previous recordings, the band was writing in the studio. Cohen said, "The jungle tom-tom rhythms were Mick's idea. They wanted to try animal drumming and that was something Phill didn't do, so Mick jumped on."

The cover art is by Ed Roth and Dave Christensen.

== Release ==
The album was released on 10 July 1982.

CD reissues added the "Release the Bats"/"Blast Off!" single recorded at London's Townhouse Studio with Nick Launay in April 1981. A second version of "Dead Joe"—originally featured on the MasterBAG August 1982 flexi-disc—also appears on the reissue.

== Critical reception ==
Professional ratings
Review scores
Source	Rating
AllMusic	3/5 stars
The Austin Chronicle	4/5 stars
The Encyclopedia of Popular Music	3/5 stars
The Great Rock Discography	6/10
MusicHound	4.5/5 stars
OndaRock	6.5/10
Ox-Fanzine	5/5 stars
Pitchfork	8.7/10
The Rolling Stone Album Guide	3/5 stars
Spin Alternative Record Guide	9/10

Critic Ned Raggett called the album a "scuzzy masterpiece" that saw "Cave's now-demonic vocals in full roar while the rest of the players revamped rhythm & blues and funk into a blood-soaked exorcism." Julian Marszalek of The Quietus writes that "Junkyard still sounds as if it’s waiting for rock music to catch up with it," calling it "a high example of uncompromised music and art [...] that exists purely on its own terms."

In October 2010, Junkyard was listed at No. 17 in the book, 100 Best Australian Albums. The album was also included in the book 1001 Albums You Must Hear Before You Die. In 2001, Q named it one of the "50 Heaviest Albums of All Time".

== Track listing ==
Original LP release
No.	Title	Lyrics	Music by	Length
1.	"She's Hit"	Nick Cave	Cave, Tracy Pew	6:06
2.	"Dead Joe"	Cave, Anita Lane	Cave	3:09
3.	"The Dim Locator"	Rowland S. Howard	R. Howard	2:50
4.	"Hamlet (Pow, Pow, Pow)"	Cave	R. Howard	5:33
5.	"Several Sins"	R. Howard, Harry Howard	R. Howard, H. Howard	2:56
6.	"Big-Jesus-Trash-Can"	Cave	Mick Harvey	3:00
7.	"Kiss Me Black"	Cave, Lane	Cave	2:48
8.	"6" Gold Blade"	Cave	Harvey	3:35
9.	"Kewpie Doll"	Cave	Harvey	3:32
10.	"Junkyard"	Cave	Cave, R. Howard	5:49
Total length:				39:18

CD reissue
No.	Title	Lyrics	Music by	Length
1.	"Blast Off"	R. Howard	R. Howard	2:19
2.	"She's Hit"	Cave	Cave, Pew	6:06
3.	"Dead Joe"	Cave, Lane	Cave	3:09
4.	"The Dim Locator"	R. Howard	R. Howard	2:50
5.	"Hamlet (Pow, Pow, Pow)"	Cave	R. Howard	5:33
6.	"Several Sins"	R. Howard, H. Howard	R. Howard, H. Howard	2:56
7.	"Big-Jesus-Trash-Can"	Cave	Harvey	3:00
8.	"Kiss Me Black"	Cave, Lane	Cave	2:48
9.	"6" Gold Blade"	Cave	Harvey	3:35
10.	"Kewpie Doll"	Cave	Harvey	3:32
11.	"Junkyard"	Cave	Cave, R. Howard	5:49
12.	"Dead Joe" (2nd Version)	Cave, Lane	Cave	3:08
13.	"Release the Bats"	Cave	Harvey	2:31
Total length:				47:17

== Personnel ==
=== The Birthday Party ===
- Nick Cave – vocals
- Mick Harvey – guitar, percussion ("She's Hit"), drums ("Dead Joe", "Hamlet (Pow, Pow, Pow)"), saxophone ("Big-Jesus-Trash-Can"), bass guitar ("Kewpie Doll"), organ ("Blast Off!"), bass drum ("Release the Bats")
- Rowland S. Howard – guitar, saxophone ("Blast Off!")
- Tracy Pew – bass guitar
- Phill Calvert – drums

=== Additional personnel ===
- Barry Adamson – bass guitar ("Kiss Me Black")

== Chart positions ==
Chart (1982)	Peak position
UK Albums Chart	73
UK Independent Albums Chart	1
