= Phill Calvert =

Australian rock drummer and producer

- Born: Phillip Calvert; 11 January 1958 (age 68); Melbourne, Victoria, Australia
- Genres: Post-punk, alternative rock
- Instruments: Drums, percussion
- Years active: 1973–present
- Labels: Mute
- Formerly of: Boys Next Door; The Birthday Party; The Psychedelic Furs; Blue Ruin

Phillip Calvert (born 11 January 1958) is an Australian rock drummer and producer best known for his playing in the post-punk band The Birthday Party with Nick Cave.

== History ==
At the private boys' school Caulfield Grammar in the early 1970s, Calvert met vocalist Nick Cave and guitarist Mick Harvey and formed a rock band with other students, playing parties and school functions. The band picked up Cave's friend Tracy Pew on bass, and after they finished secondary school they named themselves The Boys Next Door in 1977. After making recordings for local independent labels Suicide (a subsidiary of Mushroom Records) and Missing Link, and playing hundreds of live shows, the band left for London in 1980 and renamed themselves The Birthday Party, signing first to 4AD Records and then to Mute Records.

After his split with The Birthday Party in 1982, Calvert joined the UK group The Psychedelic Furs, touring the U.S., but never recorded with them. He left before they recorded Mirror Moves in 1984.

He returned to Melbourne and in 1985 became a founding member of the rock group Blue Ruin. They recorded five LPs with Calvert and travelled to the UK. Calvert split with Blue Ruin in the late '80s. Blue Ruin reformed with Calvert for some shows in 2006.

Guitarist Ben Ling and Calvert have also co-produced the Melbourne band Witch Hats on releases Wound of a Little Horse (2006), Cellulite Soul (2008) and Solarium Down the Causeway (2009). In 2015 Calvert launched the label Behind the Beat Records with associate Ben Ling. The first artist on the label is Seri Vida.

As of 2020 Calvert makes assemblage sculpture in collaboration with his wife Julia under the name "Kitty Calvert".

== Selected discography ==
=== Albums ===
- The Boys Next Door - Door, Door (1979)
- The Birthday Party - Hee Haw (EP) (1980)
- The Birthday Party - Prayers On Fire (1981)
- The Birthday Party - Junkyard (1982)
- The Birthday Party - It's Still Living
- The Birthday Party - Live
- The Birthday Party - John Peel Sessions
- Blue Ruin - Such Sweet Thunder (1986)
- Blue Ruin - Flame (1987)
- Blue Ruin - Strange Things In The Corner (1988)
- Blue Ruin - Lighthouse Girl (1989)
- Blue Ruin - I'm Gonna Smile (1990)
- The Sunday Kind - The Sunday Kind (1993)
- Sugarhips - Sugarhips (1999)
- Bulletproof - Exciting Real Life Drama (2002)
- The Enthusiasts - I Hate Everybody (2006)

=== DVD ===
- The Birthday Party - Pleasure Heads Must Burn

=== As producer ===
- The Enthusiasts - I Hate Everybody (2006)
- Witch Hats - Wound of a Little Horse (2006)
- Witch Hats - Cellulite Soul (2008)
- Witch Hats - Solarium Down the Causeway (2009)
- Seri Vida - To be Free (2012)
- Masses - Horde Mentality EP (2014)
- Seri Vida - The Wait (2015)
- Masses - Moloch (2016)
- Astrid Munday - Beauty in the Ordinary (2020)

== See also ==
- List of Caulfield Grammar School people
