= Tracy Pew =

Australian musician (1957–1986)

- Tracy Pew of The Birthday Party, Victoria College, Prahran, 1981

Background information
- Born: Tracy Franklin Pew; 19 December 1957; Australia
- Origin: Melbourne, Victoria, Australia
- Died: 7 November 1986 (aged 28) Melbourne, Victoria, Australia
- Genres: Rock and roll, post-punk
- Occupation: Musician
- Instruments: Bass, double bass, wind, clarinet
- Years active: 1975–1986
- Labels: Mushroom, Missing Link

Tracy Franklin Pew (19 December 1957 – 7 November 1986) was an Australian musician, and bassist for The Birthday Party. He was later a member of The Saints, and worked with Nick Cave and the Bad Seeds.

As a member of the Birthday Party, Pew became associated with their "prodigious consumption of drugs and alcohol". In 1982, he was imprisoned for ten weeks in HM Prison Won Wron on charges relating to driving under the influence of alcohol. He died on 7 November 1986 of a brain haemorrhage, after sustaining head injuries during an epileptic seizure; he was aged 28.

== Biography ==
Tracy Franklin Pew was born on 19 December 1957 in Australia; he moved with his family to New Zealand in 1959, but they returned in May 1964. From 1972, he attended Caulfield Grammar School in Melbourne. He lived in Mount Waverley and learned to play bass from his friend, Chris Walsh.

Pew joined a rock band, The Boys Next Door, in 1975; it included his schoolfriends Nick Cave on vocals, Mick Harvey on guitar and Phill Calvert on drums. In May 1978, they provided three tracks for the Suicide Records compilation by various artists, Lethal Weapons, including two tracks each by Teenage Radio Stars and JAB. The Boys Next Door added Rowland S. Howard on guitar in December 1978; in April 1979, they issued their debut album Door, Door on Mushroom Records. In October that year they released a shared single, "Scatterbrain", backed with "Early Morning Brain (It's Not Quite the Same as Sobriety)" by alternative rockers Models.

=== Move to London ===
In February 1980, The Boys Next Door renamed themselves The Birthday Party and relocated to London. Rowland S. Howard recalls, "About the time of Hee Haw we decided to move to London ... we got very little press and our audience had reached a plateau. There was nowhere we could go. So we figured we had to go somewhere that, by virtue of population, there was more people that would be interested in seeing a band that was not a commercial proposition." In November that year they returned to Australia, released their debut album Prayers on Fire in April 1981, and were back in London by August. Pew wrote a track, "The Plague", for Prayers on Fire, but it did not make the cut; it later appeared on Drunk on the Pope's Blood (1991). The Birthday Party returned to the Crystal Ballroom. Ashley Crawford recalls "the only one who looked part of a more-or-less traditional rock'n'roll band was Tracy Pew, inevitably resplendent in fishnet singlet and ten-gallon Stetson, wielding a bass guitar like an AK47 and known to occasionally stuff his head into the centre of the bass drum as he flailed at his bass guitar".

On 16 February 1982, Pew was imprisoned on charges relating to driving under the influence of alcohol and a series of accumulated fines; he was sentenced to ten weeks in HM Prison Won Wron, a minimum security prison farm near Yarram. In Rowland S. Howard's words, "I'd been in quite a few trips with Tracy where somewhere along the journey you'd find out the car was stolen. I remember we were driving around Melbourne and there were all these kids' pictures floating around in the back seat. He'd stolen some poor primary school teacher's car." During Pew's stretch at Won Wron, he was temporarily replaced in the band by Chris Walsh (of The Moodists) for the band's subsequent Melbourne shows, and Barry Adamson (of Magazine) and Harry Howard (Rowland's brother) for their UK shows. Pew returned to the band after his release with a gig in Hammersmith on 26 May 1982. In August the group relocated to Berlin.

According to rock music historian Ian McFarlane, "Rivalries within the group had intensified, and the prodigious consumption of drugs and alcohol by various members began to undermine any sense of unity. Matters came to a head when Harvey refused to undertake a tour of Australia at the end of May 1983". Gerald Houghton found the group "was a jolly adventure in drugs, alcohol, and more drugs and even more alcohol. Here if you want them are the king-size fuck-ups of guitarist Roland S. Howard, Cave and particularly leather-trousered bassist Tracy Pew. Stories are rampant about the congenial, erudite Pew's excesses, of OD-ing offstage and collapsing on". Howard recalls that they had "spent the last 4 years not really making any money, living in each others' pockets, homeless. We just need to take a ... breath!"

=== Return to Melbourne ===
The Birthday Party played their last gig on 9 June 1983, although early in 1984 Pew briefly played bass for Nick Cave – Man or Myth?, the forerunner of Nick Cave and the Bad Seeds, on a live tour. Pew returned to Melbourne to study literature and philosophy at Monash University. In mid-1984, singer-songwriter Chris Bailey asked Pew to join a touring line-up of his punk band The Saints, alongside Chris Burnham on guitar and Ian Shedden on drums. Former Saints' member Ed Kuepper agreed to return and toured with the band, replacing Pew on bass, but left after several weeks due to old conflicts resurfacing. Pew contributed to Nick Cave and the Bad Seeds' album of cover versions, Kicking Against the Pricks (August 1986), and performed on Lydia Lunch's concept album Honeymoon in Red (1987).

During his musical career, Pew was credited with playing bass guitar, double bass, wind, and clarinet. He received songwriting credits for "She's Hit" on Junkyard (May 1982), "Sonny's Burning" on The Bad Seed (October 1982) and "Swampland" on Mutiny (1983).

== Personal life and death ==
According to Gina Riley, comedian from TV series Kath & Kim, Pew dated her in 1976. In April 2009, Riley recalled the relationship on the musical quiz show Spicks and Specks. Pew was prone to epileptic seizures, at times exacerbated by heavy drug use, although he had cleaned up by the mid-1980s. In late 1986, he experienced a fit whilst in his bath, resulting in head injuries so severe he died days later, on 7 November 1986, from a brain haemorrhage. He was 28 years old.
