= The Birthday Party (band) =

Australian band

- The Birthday Party in 1981, from left to right: Tracy Pew, Phill Calvert, Mick Harvey, Rowland S. Howard and Nick Cave.

Background information
- Also known as: The Boys Next Door
- Origin: Melbourne, Victoria, Australia
- Genres: Post-punk; noise rock; punk blues; gothic rock; art punk; blues rock
- Years active: 1977–1983
- Labels: Missing Link, 4AD, Shock
- Spinoffs: Nick Cave and the Bad Seeds
- Past members: Nick Cave; Mick Harvey; Tracy Pew; Phill Calvert; Rowland S. Howard
- Website: thebirthdayparty.com.au

The Birthday Party (originally known as the Boys Next Door) were an Australian post-punk band, active from 1977 to 1983. The group's "bleak and noisy soundscapes," which drew irreverently on blues, free jazz, and rockabilly, provided the setting for vocalist Nick Cave's disturbing tales of violence and perversion. Their 1981 single "Release the Bats" was particularly influential on the emerging gothic scene. Despite limited commercial success, the Birthday Party's influence has been far-reaching, and they have been called "one of the darkest and most challenging post-punk groups to emerge in the early '80s."

In 1980, the Birthday Party moved from Melbourne to London, where they were championed by broadcaster John Peel. They subsequently released two albums: Prayers on Fire (1981) and Junkyard (1982). Disillusioned by their stay in London, the band's sound and live shows became increasingly violent. They broke up soon after relocating to West Berlin in 1982. The creative core of the Birthday Party – singer and songwriter Nick Cave, multi-instrumentalist and songwriter Mick Harvey, and singer, songwriter and guitarist Rowland S. Howard – later went on to acclaimed careers.

== History ==
=== Early years and The Boys Next Door (1973–1978) ===
The nucleus of the band first met at the private boys' school Caulfield Grammar School, in suburban Melbourne, in the early seventies. A rock group was formed in 1973, with Nick Cave (vocals), Mick Harvey (guitar), and Phill Calvert (drums), with other students John Cocivera, Brett Purcell and Chris Coyne (on guitar, bass and saxophone respectively). Most were also members of the school choir. The band played under various names at parties and school functions with a mixed repertoire of David Bowie, Lou Reed, Roxy Music, Alice Cooper and the Sensational Alex Harvey Band, among others. Saxophonist Chris Coyne went on to join the Paul Kelly Band in the 1980s.

After their final school year in 1975 the band decided to continue as a four-piece group, with friend Tracy Pew picking up the bass. Greatly affected by the punk explosion of 1976 which saw Australian bands The Saints and Radio Birdman making their first recordings and tours, the Boys Next Door, as they were now called, began performing punk and proto-punk cover versions, such as "Blitzkrieg Bop" and "Gloria", and a few original songs. By November 1977 their set was dominated by fast original new wave material, such as "Sex Crimes" and "Masturbation Generation". In 1978 they contributed three tracks to Suicide Record's compilation album, Lethal Weapons. Two of these songs were also released as a single.

The Boys' second guitarist, Rowland S. Howard, joined in 1978, and about this time the group's sound changed dramatically. The addition of Howard's guitar was a catalyst (his later use of audio feedback being a hallmark of the group) but there were other changes, as well: their sound drew upon punk, rockabilly, free jazz and blues, but defied categorization. Many songs were driven by prominent, repetitive basslines and frenetic, minimalist drumming. In producer/engineer Tony Cohen they found a collaborator sympathetic to their experimentation and their refusal to repeat themselves, and in manager Keith Glass they found an enthusiastic financial backer. Glass' label Missing Link Records released all of the early Birthday Party records.

=== Name change and relocations (1978–1982) ===
The Boys Next Door's best known song, "Shivers", written by Howard, and first performed and recorded by his band the Young Charlatans, was banned by radio stations because of a reference to suicide. After recordings and moderate success in Australia (including hundreds of live shows) they headed for London in 1980, changed their name to the Birthday Party and launched into a period of innovative and aggressive music-making. Some sources say the band took its new name from the Harold Pinter play The Birthday Party; others (including Ian Johnston's Cave biography) state it was prompted by Cave misremembering, or intentionally misattributing, the name to a non-existent birthday party scene in the Dostoyevsky novel Crime and Punishment. In a 2008 interview, Rowland S. Howard gave his own recollection: "The name The Birthday Party came up in conversation between Nick and myself. There's this apocryphal story about it coming from a Dostoyevsky novel. It may have had various connotations, but what he and I spoke about was a sense of celebration and making things into more an occasion and ritual".

From their base in London, the band took trips back to Australia and tours through Europe and the U.S. before relocating to West Berlin in 1982. Above the barely-controlled racket, Cave's vocals ranged from desperate to simply menacing and demented. Critics have written that "neither John Cale nor Alfred Hitchcock was ever this scary," and that Cave "doesn't so much sing his vocals as expel them from his gut". Though Cave drew on earlier rock and roll shriekers—especially Iggy Pop and Suicide's Alan Vega—his singing with the Birthday Party remains powerful and distinct. His lyrics also drew on Arthur Rimbaud and Charles Baudelaire.

The single "Release the Bats" came out during the emergence of the gothic scene. This song about "vampire sex" was promoted by an advertisement with the words "Dirtiness is next to antigodliness".

Their 1982 album Junkyard was inspired by American Southern Gothic imagery, dealing with extreme subjects like an evangelist's murdered daughter.

=== Final years (1982–1983) ===
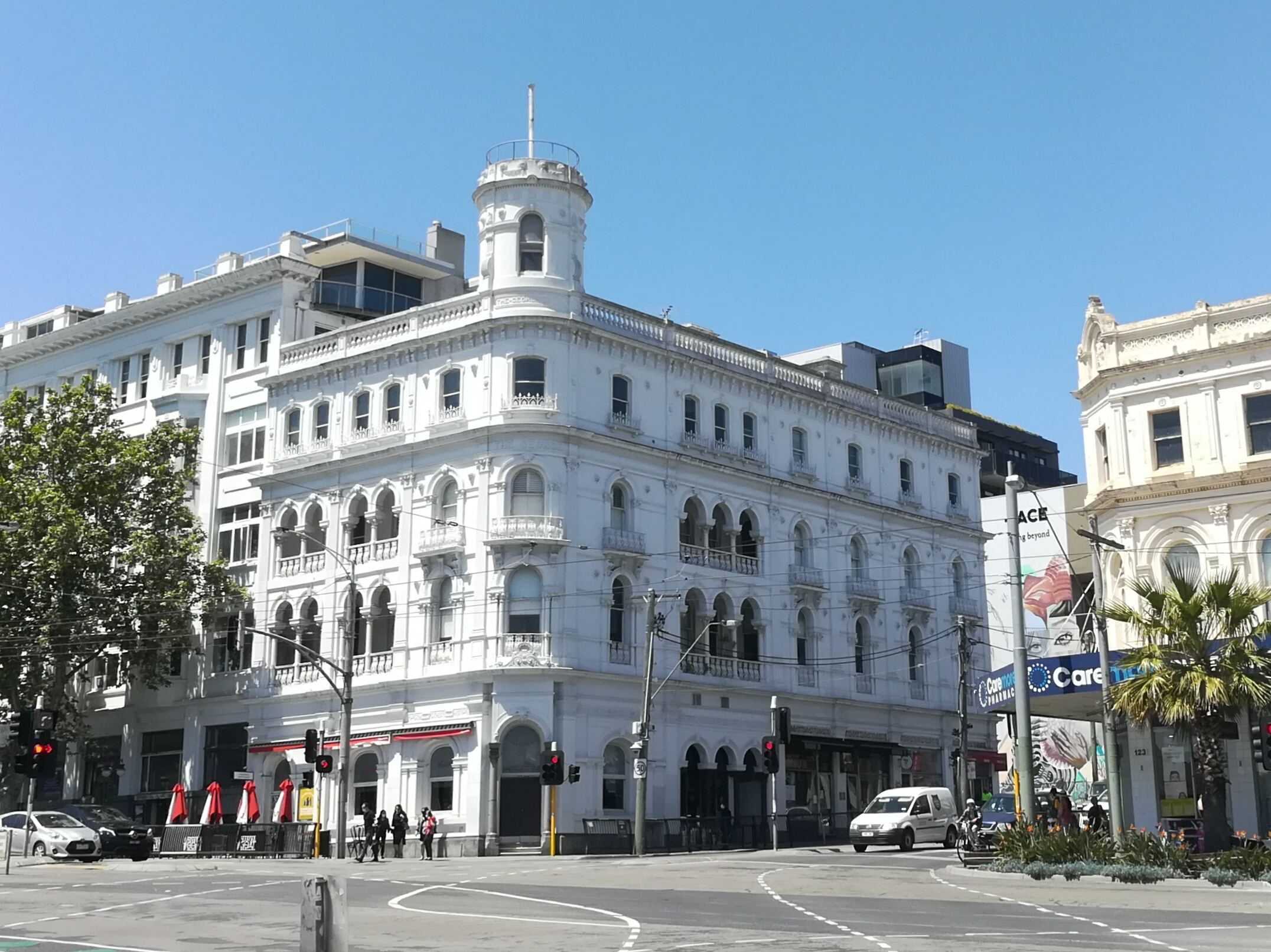
The Birthday Party were regulars at Melbourne's Crystal Ballroom, playing their final show there in 1983.

For the Birthday Party, things had changed. Calvert was ejected in 1982; he was reportedly "unable to nail down the beats for 'Dead Joe' to everyone's satisfaction", and Harvey moved to drums. When Pew was jailed for drunk driving and petty theft early in 1982, Chris Walsh, Barry Adamson and Howard's brother Harry replaced him for live appearances and brief studio work. Pew rejoined the band in July.

The Mutiny EP contained lyrics evoking blasphemy, words which were as dark as the gothic poems of Lautréamont. The title track portrayed a dirty heaven with rats and trash.

In 1982 a spin-off group with Lydia Lunch, Honeymoon in Red, recorded an album which was eventually released in 1987. Harvey and Cave were reportedly so unhappy with the mixing and overdubbing done after their involvement that they requested their names be withheld from its liner notes. Howard and Pew apparently had no objections to being credited by name.

A tour in January 1983 found the group return to a five-piece, with Jeffrey Wegener playing drums and Harvey returning to second guitar. Wegener did not remain with the group, however, and they returned to a four-piece soon after. Later that year, Blixa Bargeld from the German group Einstürzende Neubauten recorded a guitar part in the studio on the track "Mutiny in Heaven". Tension between Cave and Howard soon came to a head, but it was Harvey who first left the group – their final tour saw Des Hefner on drums. The Birthday Party played their final show at the Crystal Ballroom in St Kilda on 9 June 1983 and disbanded not long after, due in part to the split between Cave and Howard, as well as work and drug-related exhaustion.

=== Post-breakup, legacy and influence ===
Several groups rose from the Birthday Party's ashes: Nick Cave and the Bad Seeds (featuring Cave, Harvey, Adamson, Bargeld and briefly Pew), Crime and the City Solution (featuring Harvey and Howard, later just Harvey) and These Immortal Souls (featuring Howard).

Pew died from injuries caused by an epileptic seizure in 1986.

On 1 September 1992, there was a brief Birthday Party reunion as Rowland S. Howard joined Nick Cave and Mick Harvey on stage at a Bad Seeds NME charity show at the Town and Country Club in London to play "Wild World", "Dead Joe" and "Nick the Stripper".

Due in part to their legendary status and to the continuing success of Nick Cave and the Bad Seeds, the Birthday Party's back catalogue has been re-released on CD several times. Mick Harvey has overseen releases of rare or previously unissued recordings (Live and John Peel CDs).

The Birthday Party's initial impact was on the gothic rock genre. According to New Musical Express, "The Party have been indirectly held responsible for the rise of a visceral new hardcore, ranging from the Sex Gang Children, through Danse Macabre to March Violets." Rock acts that have cited the Birthday Party as an influence include My Bloody Valentine, Alex Turner, and LCD Soundsystem. In 2006, American label Three One G released Release The Bats: The Birthday Party As Heard Through The Meat Grinder Of Three One G, a compilation featuring covers by various bands, including Daughters, Melt-Banana and Cattle Decapitation.

In October 2007, Cave alone was inducted into the ARIA Hall of Fame. During his acceptance speech, Cave took it upon himself to 'induct' the Australian members of the Bad Seeds (including Harvey), plus Howard and Pew from The Birthday Party.

Rowland S. Howard died on 30 December 2009 of liver cancer. In 2012, Howard's early songs were played live as a tribute in Melbourne: a four-piece band played consisting of Harvey, Calvert, Ron Rude and Rowland Howard's sister Angela.

== Musical style ==
The band's music is described as a "bleak, gothic approach to garage rock," characterized by "bleak and noisy soundscapes" and use of audio feedback. Additionally, the band's music incorporated elements of blues and rockabilly. Stephen Thomas of AllMusic called them "one of the darkest and most challenging post-punk groups to emerge in the early '80s." He described Nick Cave's lyrics "difficult, disturbing stories" that explore themes such religion, violence, and perversion." The band's later material is considered to be darker, "alternat[ing] between dirges to blistering sonic assaults."

== Members ==
Band members

- Nick Cave – vocals, saxophone (1977–1983)
- Mick Harvey – guitar, drums, keyboards (1977–1983)
- Rowland S. Howard – guitar, vocals, saxophone (1978–1983; died 2009)
- Tracy Pew – bass, clarinet (1977–1982, 1982–1983; died 1986)
- Phill Calvert – drums (1977–1982)

Touring and guest musicians

- Chris Walsh – bass (February 1982)
- Barry Adamson – bass (April–May 1982)
- Harry Howard – bass (June–July 1982)
- Jeffrey Wegener – drums (January 1983)
- Des Hefner – drums (May–June 1983)
- Blixa Bargeld – guitar (April 1983, in-studio guest)

== Discography ==
The Boys Next Door

- Door, Door (1979)
- The Birthday Party (1980)

The Birthday Party

- Prayers on Fire (1981)
- Junkyard (1982)
