= Missing Link Records =

Coordinates: 37°48′53″S 144°57′43″E

Missing Link
- Founded: 1977
- Founder: Keith Glass; David Pepperell
- Distributors: Shock Records (AUS); Ebulliton Records (US)
- Genre: punk, new wave, post-punk
- Country of origin: Australia
- Location: Melbourne, Victoria
- Official website: missinglinkrecords.com

Missing Link Records was an Australian-based independent record label established in 1977. The Missing Link label was created by Keith Glass (singer-guitarist, ex-Cam-Pact) and David Pepperell (journalist and vocalist, ex-The Union) who were the owners of a Melbourne record store of the same name. The name was taken from a 1960s Australian rock band, the Missing Links. The label's initial releases were two retrospective 7-inch singles, "The Ultimate Garage Band" by the Union and "Living in the 60's" by Cam-Pact, both of which were bands from the 1960s that the owners had respectively performed with. Following a few more releases, Pepperell departed and the label took on a new contemporary release program to reflect the punk-new wave movement of the late 1970s. According to the rock music historian Ian McFarlane "[it] was a cornerstone organisation on Melbourne's independent scene of the late 1970s". The label became influential through the release of both Australian and overseas material, scoring a top 20 hit single with the local release of the Flying Lizards' kitchen electronic version of "Money" (1979) when it was passed over by Festival Records.

In 1978 the label signed the Boys Next Door, a punk band featuring Nick Cave, Mick Harvey, Phill Calvert and Tracy Pew for whom Glass was also the manager. In 1980, the band renamed themselves as The Birthday Party. They became the flagship of the label, recording three albums and being licensed around the world, with the single "Release the Bats" reaching number 1 on the UK Alternative charts. Other notable local artists released by Missing Link Records include Bleeding Hearts, the Go-Betweens, Whirlywirld, the Laughing Clowns and Dynamic Hepnotics. The label continued to release 1960s retrospectives, local Australian contemporary punk and new wave and licensed material from overseas. International licensed releases included those by Snakefinger, the Residents and Dead Kennedys.

In 2002, Glass reactivated the Missing Link label and one of its first releases was a nineteen-track Cam-Pact compilation, Psychedelic Pop 'n' Soul 1967-69, featuring all the group's studio recordings, plus many previously unreleased tracks.

In 2006 the shop started releasing records again under the Missing Link name. The releases include local Australian acts such as Agents of Aborrence, Los Diablos, Terror Firma, the Focus, True Radical Miracle, Mutiny and licensed releases for the Australian market by Minus the Bear, Regulations, and Bouncing Souls.

In October 2011, Missing Link Records ceased trading at its 405 Bourke Street Melbourne address, citing adverse trading conditions over the past few years brought about by the continued decline in hardcopy music sales, the ever present theft of music and multitude of digital options.

== See also ==
- List of record labels
