= Death Is Not the End =

Death Is Not the End can refer to:

- "Death Is Not the End", a song by Bob Dylan from the album Down in the Groove (1988), covered by The Waterboys in 1988, Gavin Friday in 1989, and Nick Cave in 1996
- Death Is Not the End, an album by Shut Up and Dance (1992)
- Death Is Not the End, a novella by Ian Rankin (1998)
- "Death Is Not the End", an episode of the series True Blood (2014)
- "Death Is Not the End", a short story by David Foster Wallace.
