= Five Ways to Say Goodbye =

Studio album by Mick Harvey
- Released: 10 May 2024
- Studio: Grace Lane, Atlantis Sound
- Length: 51:31
- Label: Mute
- Producer: Mick Harvey, Amanda Acevedo

Mick Harvey chronology
Phantasmagoria in Blue (2023)	Five Ways to Say Goodbye (2024)

Singles from Five Ways to Say Goodbye
- 1. "When We Were Beautiful & Young" Released: 13 February 2024

Five Ways to Say Goodbye is the eleventh studio album by Australian musician and singer-songwriter Mick Harvey. It was released on 10 May 2024, by Mute Records.

== Background ==
The first solo album by Harvey since Intoxicated Women in 2017, Five Ways to Say Goodbye is themed around mortality and loss. It consists of twelve tracks composed of reinterpretations of work by other musicians such as David McComb, Chris Bailey and Ed Kuepper of the Saints, Lo Carmen, Neil Young and Marlene Dietrich, and original material.

The album's lead single, "When We Were Beautiful & Young", was released on February 13, 2024, and its music video was published on Mute's YouTube channel.

== Reception ==
Professional ratings
Review scores
Source	Rating
AllMusic	4/5 stars
Rolling Stone	4.5/5 stars

Mark Deming of AllMusic reviewed the album, stating "Five Ways to Say Goodbye is a remarkable work that's deeply moving and crafted with intelligence and heart." Rolling Stone gave the album a rating of 4.5 out of 5.

Theatrical website BroadwayWorld wrote "Across the album, Harvey creates a coherent mood between other people's songs and his own, as though they are all part of the same lineage and interconnected sonic world," and BrooklynVegan remarked "(the album) feels like a mix of everything he’s done in his long solo career that has included four albums of Serge Gainsbourg adaptations/translations and numerous soundtracks."

== Track listing ==
No.	Title	Writer(s)	Length
1.	"Heaven's Gate"	Mick Harvey	4:03
2.	"We Had an Island"	Bruno Adams	3:21
3.	"Demolition"	Ed Kuepper	4:14
4.	"The Art of Darkness"	Louis Tillett, Harvey	3:56
5.	"Setting You Free"	David McComb	3:32
6.	"Alone with the Stars"	Francesca Bono, Howie Bernstein, Michele Postpischl, Tato Izzia	4:05
7.	"Nashville High"	Loene Carmen	5:04
8.	"Ghost Ships"	Chris Bailey	4:17
9.	"Dirtnap Stories"	Lee Hazlewood	3:07
10.	"When We Were Beautiful & Young"	Harvey	4:39
11.	"A Suitcase in Berlin"	Aldo von Pinelli, Ralph Maria Siegel	5:25
12.	"Like a Hurricane"	Neil Young	5:12
Total length:			51:31

== Personnel ==
- Mick Harvey – vocals, guitar, bass, keyboards, drums, arrangements, production
- Amanda Acevedo – backing vocals (track 9), cover layout, production (assistant)
- Charlotte Jacke – cello (tracks 2, 3, 5, 7, 9)
- Zoe Barry – cello (tracks 1, 4, 6, 10, 11)
- J.P. Shilo – looped guitar (tracks 4, 11)
- Biddy Connor – viola (tracks 1–6, 7, 9–11)
- Leigh Raymond – violin (tracks 4–6, 9)
- Lizzy Welsh – violin (tracks 1–4, 6, 7, 10, 11)
- Steph O'Hara – violin (tracks 1–3, 5, 7, 9–11)
- David McCluney – recording (strings and drums)
- Mikey Young – mastering
- Peter Milne – cover photography
