= Your Funeral... My Trial =

Studio album by Nick Cave and the Bad Seeds
- Released: 3 November 1986
- Recorded: July–August 1986
- Studios: Hansa Tonstudio (West Berlin); Strongroom (London)
- Genres: Gothic rock; art rock
- Length: 42:49
- Label: Mute
- Producers: Flood; Tony Cohen

Nick Cave and the Bad Seeds chronology
Kicking Against the Pricks (1986)	Your Funeral... My Trial (1986)	Tender Prey (1988)

Professional ratings
Review scores
Source	Rating
AllMusic	4.5/5 stars
Mojo	5/5 stars
Pitchfork	9.4/10
Q	5/5 stars
Record Collector	4/5 stars
The Rolling Stone Album Guide	3.5/5 stars
Sounds	4.5/5 stars
Spin Alternative Record Guide	9/10
Uncut	4/5 stars

Your Funeral... My Trial is the fourth studio album by the rock band Nick Cave and the Bad Seeds, released on 3 November 1986 by Mute Records. The album was originally released as a double extended play (EP), while also issued on CD with a different running order and the additional track "Scum" which was originally a stand-alone single. During this period in his life, Cave was steeped in heroin addiction, perhaps evidenced by the melancholy, desperate mood of this album. This was the final Bad Seeds album to feature bassist Barry Adamson until he returned for the band's fifteenth studio album Push the Sky Away (2013). The title song is not related to "Your Funeral & My Trial", a 1958 single by the American blues musician Sonny Boy Williamson.

In 1993, Cave said of the album: "That particular record, which is my favourite of the records we've done, is very special to me and a lot of amazing things happened, musically, in the studio. There are some songs on that record that as far as I'm concerned are just about perfect as we can get really- songs like "The Carny", "Your Funeral, My Trial", and "Stranger Than Kindness", I think are really quite brilliant." Your Funeral... My Trial was the band's first album to reach the ARIA Top 100 Albums Chart, where it peaked at number 98, and also reached number one on the UK Independent Albums Chart.

The album was remastered and reissued on 27 April 2009 as a collector's edition CD/DVD set. The CD features the original 8-song vinyl double EP's track listing and track order, while "Scum" is featured as a bonus audio track on the accompanying DVD.

== Recording ==
Record producer Flood said, "I remember Mick Harvey arrived in the studio with the guts of an old grand piano, that was the basis of the sound. It was just the strings, attached to a metal frame. He tuned certain notes, and used a guitar plectrum to pick the notes. It then ended up as "The Carny". That was the first day of recording Your Funeral… My Trial, and that kind of set the tone for the whole record."

Reflecting on the album in 2020, guitarist Mick Harvey noted: "[The album] gave us the template to go forward with. It was organised rather than rambling. It all felt complete even though it was a disparate set of sounds and styles. It felt like it belonged to us. It sounded like The Bad Seeds."

== Films ==
Nick Cave and the Bad Seeds appeared in the Wim Wenders film Der Himmel über Berlin (1987), performing "The Carny" (which is heard once before the performance scene) and "From Her to Eternity". "The Carny" also inspired the animated twelve-minute film Jo Jo in the Stars (2003), which won the BAFTA Award for Best Animated Short Film. The film was created and directed by Marc Craste, who said about "The Carny": "The lyrics read like a short story, it seemed to suggest a film – a straight visual interpretation of the text ..."

== Track listing ==
All tracks are written by Nick Cave, except where noted.

Side one
No.	Title	Length
1.	"Sad Waters"	5:00
2.	"The Carny"	8:01

Side two
No.	Title	Writer(s)	Length
3.	"Your Funeral My Trial"		3:56
4.	"Stranger Than Kindness"	Anita Lane; Blixa Bargeld	4:47

Side three
No.	Title	Writer(s)	Length
5.	"Jack's Shadow"	Cave; Mick Harvey	5:41
6.	"Hard On For Love"		5:19

Side four
No.	Title	Writer(s)	Length
7.	"She Fell Away"		4:30
8.	"Long Time Man"	Tim Rose	5:35

CD version
No.	Title	Writer(s)	Length
1.	"Your Funeral My Trial"		3:57
2.	"Stranger Than Kindness"	Anita Lane; Blixa Bargeld	4:47
3.	"Jack's Shadow"	Cave; Mick Harvey	5:43
4.	"The Carny"		8:02
5.	"She Fell Away"		4:33
6.	"Hard On for Love"		5:21
7.	"Sad Waters"		5:02
8.	"Long Time Man"	Tim Rose	5:48
9.	"Scum"	Cave; Mick Harvey	2:53
Total length:			46:06

== Personnel ==
Personnel for Your Funeral... My Trial adapted from the album's liner notes for the CD edition.

Nick Cave and the Bad Seeds

- Nick Cave – vocals (1–9); piano (5, 7, 8); Hammond (1, 3, 4, 6); harmonica (1, 2)
- Mick Harvey – bass guitar (1, 6–9); guitar (1, 3, 5–8); drums (1, 3, 4, 8); snare drum (7); piano (2, 3); organ (2); glockenspiel (2); xylophone (2, 7); backing vocals (6)
- Blixa Bargeld – guitar (1–9); co-lead vocals (2)
- Barry Adamson – bass (3, 5)
- Thomas Wydler – drums (2, 3, 5, 7, 9); fire extinguisher (7)

Technical personnel

- Flood – producer; engineer; mixing
- Tony Cohen – producer; engineer

Design personnel

- Nick Cave – art direction
- Paul White – art direction
- Christoph Dreher – photography

== Chart positions ==
Chart (1986)	Peak position
UK Independent Albums Chart	1
