= Sex O'Clock =

Sex O'Clock may be:

- Sex O'Clock (album), by Anita Lane
- Sex O'Clock (TV series), a Czech comedy
- Sex O'Clock USA, a film directed by François Reichenbach
