= The Carny =

Song by Nick Cave and the Bad Seeds

from the album Your Funeral... My Trial
- Released: 3 November 1986
- Recorded: July – August 1986
- Studio: Hansa Tonstudio (West Berlin); Strongroom (London)
- Genre: Gothic rock; art rock; post-punk
- Length: 8:01
- Label: Mute
- Songwriter: Nick Cave
- Producers: Flood; Tony Cohen

Official audio
- "The Carny" on YouTube

"The Carny" is a song by the Australian rock band Nick Cave and the Bad Seeds appearing on their fourth studio album Your Funeral... My Trial (1986). It was written by Nick Cave and was recorded in August 1986 at Hansa Tonstudio in West Berlin, Germany and Strongroom in London, England.

== Subject ==
The lyrics concern a carnival worker who vanished, highlighted in the words "No one saw the Carny go". As the circus prepares to leave without the missing performer, they find the Carny's horse Sorrow, "so skin and bone", and kill it. The dwarfs Moses and Noah dig a ditch to bury it, later remarking "we should've dug a deeper one". When it begins to rain, the Carny's caravan is swept away.

The song is featured in Wim Wenders' romantic fantasy film Wings of Desire (1987), when the character Marion (Solveig Dommartin) listens to the album Your Funeral... My Trial. The song corresponds to the plot, in which the circus that Marion works for as a trapeze artist closes down. Professor Adrian Danks wrote "The Carny" adds a feel of sorrow in the background, while Marion gives "breathy accompaniment". Cave personally appears in the film in later scenes.

== Accolades ==
Year	Publication	Country	Accolade	Rank
2004	Mojo	United Kingdom	100 Epic Rock Tracks	58
2011	Dave Thompson	United Kingdom	1000 Songs that Rock Your World	304

== Personnel ==
Adapted from the Your Funeral... My Trial liner notes.

Nick Cave and the Bad Seeds

- Nick Cave – lead vocals; harmonica
- Blixa Bargeld – guitar; co-lead vocals
- Mick Harvey – organ; piano; glockenspiel; xylophone
- Thomas Wydler – drums

Production and additional personnel

- Tony Cohen – production; engineering
- Flood – production; engineering; mixing

== See also ==
- Nick Cave and the Bad Seeds discography
