= Murder Ballads =

Studio album by Nick Cave and the Bad Seeds
- Released: 5 February 1996
- Recorded: 1993–1995
- Genre: Murder ballad
- Length: 58:43
- Label: Mute
- Producers: Victor Van Vugt; Tony Cohen; The Bad Seeds

Nick Cave and the Bad Seeds chronology
Let Love In (1994)	Murder Ballads (1996)	The Boatman's Call (1997)

Singles from Murder Ballads
- 1. "Where the Wild Roses Grow" Released: 2 October 1995; 2. "Henry Lee" Released: 26 February 1996

Murder Ballads is the ninth studio album by the Australian rock band Nick Cave and the Bad Seeds, released on 5 February 1996 by Mute Records. As its title suggests, the album consists of new and traditional murder ballads, a genre of songs that relays the details (and often consequences) of crimes of passion.

"Where the Wild Roses Grow", a duet featuring Cave singing with fellow Australian singer Kylie Minogue, was a hit single and received two ARIA Music Awards in 1996. Other prominent guest musicians on the album include then-partner PJ Harvey and Shane MacGowan of the Pogues.

== Recording ==
A blues, country, lounge, jazz and gangsta rap album, Murder Ballads was the band's biggest commercial success to date, most likely helped by the unexpected repeated airplay of the "Where the Wild Roses Grow" music video on MTV. MTV even nominated Cave for their "best male artist" award of that year, though this nomination was later withdrawn at Cave's request. Cave later said, "I was kind of aware that people would go and buy the Murder Ballads album and listen to it and wonder 'What the fuck have I bought this for?' because the Kylie song wasn't any true indication of what the record was actually like."

The first song written for the album was "O'Malley's Bar", when the band was recording Henry's Dream (1992). According to Cave, the idea for the Murder Ballads album came from this song: "We couldn't use 'O'Malley's Bar' on any of our other records. So we had to make a record, an environment where the songs could exist." Recordings were done towards the end of the Let Love In (1994) sessions, and there was some thought that the early material could be made into a film with John Hillcoat. Cave said, "I was going around everywhere with letters of intent, pushing them at everyone I knew, saying 'Do you want to be in this film?'" For the TV documentary Great Australian Albums members described their work on Murder Ballads.

== Songs ==
- "Stagger Lee" is based on a traditional song about the African American murderer of the same name. Cave's version draws most of the lyrics from a 1967 transcription published in the 1976 book The Life: The Lore and Folk Poetry of the Black Hustler, while the music itself is updated into a reggae song.
- "Death Is Not the End" includes vocalists Anita Lane, Kylie Minogue, PJ Harvey, and Shane MacGowan, along with Cave himself and Bad Seeds drummer Thomas Wydler and guitarist Blixa Bargeld. They each sing a verse in this cover of a Bob Dylan song, the only song in which an actual death does not occur. Cave later described it as, "just kind of a jokey little punctuation mark to the whole thing. There's tongue-in-cheek to that song, even though I think it's quite a beautiful rendition."

== Critical reception ==
Professional ratings
Review scores
Source	Rating
AllMusic	4/5 stars
Entertainment Weekly	A
The Guardian	4/5 stars
Los Angeles Times	3.5/4 stars
NME	7/10
Pitchfork	9.2/10
Q	3/5 stars
Rolling Stone	4/5 stars
Select	5/5
Spin	5/10

Upon release, Murder Ballads received widespread critical acclaim. Bill van Parys of Rolling Stone wrote that "never before have manic elements elevated Cave's shtick to art as on Murder Ballads", describing the album as "literate, sultry and tortured" and "the performance of Nick Cave's life." Tony Scherman of Entertainment Weekly warned that Murder Ballads was "not for the squeamish," calling it "the rare pop record that resonates with the weight of the ages". In The New York Times, Neil Strauss felt that the album "is about more than storytelling", adding that Cave "meticulously creates a macabre fable and then distills it to a single image of death in much the way a photographer arranges a studio shoot". In a mixed review, Spin's Chris Norris complimented the album's "sordid epics and dark confessionals", but felt that Cave's "rheumy Poe-ish romance" songs were less effective.

In the English music press, Select's Clark Collis remarked that Murder Ballads "weaves itself together into a meditation on death that is both beautiful and genuinely unnerving." Dave Henderson of Q observed that "musically, the Bad Seeds touch on tinkling cabaret jazz, country-paced morbidity and every morose station between." Murder Ballads ranked number 16 on Melody Maker's list of 1996's Albums of the Year and number 7 in the NME's 1996 critics' poll.

In December 2021, the album was ranked at no. 13 in Rolling Stone Australia's "200 Greatest Australian Albums of All Time" list.

== Track listing ==
All tracks are written by Nick Cave, except where noted.

No.	Title	Writer(s)	Length
1.	"Song of Joy"		6:47
2.	"Stagger Lee"	Traditional; Cave	5:15
3.	"Henry Lee" (featuring PJ Harvey)	Traditional; Cave	3:58
4.	"Lovely Creature"	Blixa Bargeld; Martyn P. Casey; Cave; Mick Harvey; Thomas Wydler	4:13
5.	"Where the Wild Roses Grow" (featuring Kylie Minogue)		3:57
6.	"The Curse of Millhaven"		6:55
7.	"The Kindness of Strangers"		4:39
8.	"Crow Jane"	Martyn P. Casey; Cave	4:14
9.	"O'Malley's Bar"		14:28
10.	"Death Is Not the End" (featuring Anita Lane, Shane MacGowan, PJ Harvey and Kylie Minogue)	Bob Dylan	4:26
Total length:			58:43

== Personnel ==
Nick Cave and the Bad Seeds

- Nick Cave – vocals (1–10); piano (1, 5, 8, 9); organ (1, 2, 4, 6, 10); Hammond organ (1); gun shots (2); string arrangement (5)
- Blixa Bargeld – guitar (1–8, 10); screams (2); vocals (10)
- Martyn P. Casey – bass (1–5, 7, 8)
- Mick Harvey – drums (1); guitar (2, 4, 5, 7, 10); acoustic guitar (3, 5), organ (3); wind organ (4); backing vocals (5); string arrangement (5); bass (6, 9); Hammond organ (8); space belt (8); percussion (9)
- Conway Savage – piano (2–4, 7, 10); backing vocals (5); organ (9)
- Jim Sclavunos – drums (2, 8); percussion (4, 10); bells (5); tambourine (6)
- Thomas Wydler – maracas (2); drums (3–7, 9, 10); tambourine (8); vocals (10)

Guest musicians

- PJ Harvey – vocals (3, 10)
- Terry Edwards – horns (4)
- Katharine Blake – additional vocals (4)
- Kylie Minogue – vocals (5, 10)
- Jen Anderson – violin (5)
- Sue Simpson – violin (5)
- Kerran Coulter – viola (5)
- Helen Mountfort – cello (5)
- Hugo Race – guitar (6)
- Warren Ellis – violin (6); accordion (6)
- Marielle Del Conte – additional vocals (7)
- Anita Lane – crying (7); vocals (10)
- Geraldine Johnston – additional vocals (8)
- Liz Corcoran – additional vocals (8)
- Shane MacGowan – vocals (10)
- Brian Hooper – bass (10)

The Moron Tabernacle Choir on "The Curse of Millhaven"

- Nick Cave
- Martyn P. Casey
- Conway Savage
- Thomas Wydler
- Warren Ellis
- Brian Hooper
- Spencer P. Jones
- Dave Graney
- Katharine Blake
- Clare Moore
- Rowland S. Howard
- James Johnston
- Ian Johnston
- Geraldine Johnston
- Astrid Munday

== Charts ==
=== Weekly charts ===
Chart (1996)	Peak position
Australian Albums (ARIA)	3
Austrian Albums (Ö3 Austria)	1
Belgian Albums (Ultratop Flanders)	5
Belgian Albums (Ultratop Wallonia)	12
Canada Top Albums/CDs (RPM)	45
Dutch Albums (Album Top 100)	18
European Albums (Eurotipsheet)	3
Finnish Albums (Suomen virallinen lista)	7
German Albums (Offizielle Top 100)	5
Hungarian Albums (MAHASZ)	17
New Zealand Albums (RMNZ)	12
Norwegian Albums (VG-lista)	1
Scottish Albums (Official Charts)	18
Swedish Albums (Sverigetopplistan)	1
Swiss Albums (Schweizer Hitparade)	14
UK Albums (Official Charts)	8

=== Year-end charts ===
Chart (1996)	Position
Austrian Albums (Ö3 Austria)	40
German Albums Chart	81
Swedish Albums (Sverigetopplistan)	61

== Certifications ==
Region	Certification	Certified units/sales
United Kingdom (BPI)	Gold	100,000^{*}
^{*} Sales figures based on certification alone.

As of 2001 the album has sold close to a million copies worldwide.

== Sources ==
- The Life: The Lore and Folk Poetry of the Black Hustler, Wepman, Newman & Binderman, Holloway House, 1976, ISBN 0-87067-367-X
