= Bambi Lee Savage =

American singer, songwriter and musician

Bambi Lee Savage (born Shannon Strong in 1963) is an American singer, songwriter and musician who also has worked as an audio engineer, most notably assisting on U2's Achtung Baby. Her song "Darlin'" was featured on the Sling Blade film soundtrack and her four independently-released albums are Matter of Time (2003), GJ and the PimpKillers (2009) Darkness Overshadowed (2012) and Berlin-Nashville Express (2019).

== Biography ==
Bambi Lee Savage was born Shannon Strong in 1963 in Pensacola, Florida. Her father, Guy Thomas Strong, was a Navy pilot who was killed in an airplane crash while working as a stunt pilot on the set of the 20th Century Fox film Tora! Tora! Tora! in 1969.

In the early 1980s, she played guitar and sang with several punk bands in Denver before moving to London in 1985 where she eventually joined former members of Nyam Nyam and Red Guitars in the band Horseland. They released a three-song EP in 1987 on the Red Rhino label.

Inspired by an Einstuerzende Neubauten concert at London’s Kilburn National Ballroom, in 1987 she relocated to Berlin where she began working as an assistant recording engineer at Hansa Tonstudio. There she assisted and/or engineered sessions for artists including U2, Goodbye Mr Mackenzie, Anita Lane and Nick Cave and the Bad Seeds.

She left her audio engineering career to concentrate on songwriting and performing, and in 1992, with Bono acting as the benefactor of her first recording session, Mick Harvey played on and produced a four-song demo of her original material. Recorded at Berlin's Vielklang Studios and also featuring guitarist Hugo Race, the tracks were to remain unreleased for several years.

As a featured artist in the 1995 German music documentary Lost in Music: Out of Country, she performed two of her alt-country songs, "I Can’t Count on My Man" and "Demon Alcohol" with guitarist Alex Hacke and drummer Moritz Wolpert. Though neither song appears on any of her releases to date, “Demon Alcohol” was later covered by Mick Harvey and released on his 2005 solo album One Man's Treasure.

At the invitation of Achtung Baby producer Daniel Lanois, in 1995 she recorded a four-song demo with engineer Mark Howard at Lanois' San Francisco recording studio. One of the songs, "Darlin'", caught the attention of Lanois and director Billy Bob Thornton while they were working on the soundtrack to the film Sling Blade, and Lanois added lead guitars and placed it in the soundtrack. This breakthrough led to negotiations with Island Records for a deal that was never finalized. She spent the next several years traveling between Berlin and the U.S., working on material and occasionally playing live. In 2003 she returned to Daniel Lanois’ studio (now in Los Angeles) to record two tracks with engineer Adam Samuels, and, combining these with the previous recordings, independently released her first album, Matter of Time.

She toured Australia in 2005, playing several shows around the country, including Byron Bay’s International Roots Music Festival accompanied by guitarist James Cruikshank, and several dates in Melbourne accompanied by Mick Harvey on guitar.

Motivated by a growing revulsion to the increasing glamorization of the sex industry and in an effort to address the issue of human trafficking, in 2006 she began work at her home studio on what would become her second album, GJ and the PimpKillers. In 2009 she completed the project at Adam Samuels’ Los Angeles recording studio with musicians Josh Klinghoffer and Steve Nistor.

In 2012 she released her third album, Darkness Overshadowed, recorded in Melbourne and produced by Mick Harvey.

Her fourth record, Berlin-Nashville Express, was released on May 10, 2019 and is a return to the original country roots she discovered while living in Berlin, blending "her Berlin punk artist time with her current Nashville residency."

== Discography ==
- Sling Blade soundtrack (1996)
- Matter of Time (2003)
- GJ and the PimpKillers (2009)
- Darkness Overshadowed (2012)
- Berlin-Nashville Express (2019)

== Videos ==
- Nearly Gone (2012) Directed by Rubén Vilar
- Oh Loneliness (2013) Directed by Rubén Vilar
- Honey (2019) Directed by Aelstrom & Lee
