= Moss Side Story =

Studio album by Barry Adamson
- Released: 6 March 1989
- Length: 54:00 (with bonus tracks)
- Label: Mute; STUMM 53
- Producer: Barry Adamson

Barry Adamson chronology
Moss Side Story (1989)	Soul Murder (1992)

Moss Side Story is the debut solo album of British musician Barry Adamson released in 1989. The album is a concept album, a soundtrack album to a non-existent crime film.

The music is almost completely instrumental except for occasional screams, vocal samples and a choir. To achieve the soundtrack effect, the song titles are descriptive of a film noir plot outline. The inner sleeve came with a short story written by Dave Graney which added to the concept. This complemented outer sleeve which displays the tag line: "In a black and white world, murder brings a touch of colour..." In a 2017 interview, Adamson reported that he recorded Moss Side Story due to his fascination with film music and as "a calling card [to] send it around to people" in hopes of being hired to write music for actual films.

Moss Side is a neighbourhood in the city of Manchester, Great Britain, where Adamson was born. The album title is a play on words in reference to Leonard Bernstein's West Side Story. The title of "The Swinging Detective" plays on Dennis Potter's series of television plays The Singing Detective, while "Round Up the Usual Suspects" quotes a line made famous by Claude Rains in Casablanca.

== Release history ==
CD versions came with three bonus tracks. Two of them - "Alfred Hitchcock Presents" and "The Man with The Golden Arm" (composed by Elmer Bernstein) - are drawn from TV or film themes. "Alfred Hitchcock Presents" is a reworking of the theme to the series of the same name, Charles Gounod's "Funeral March of a Marionette."

== Reception ==
Professional ratings
Review scores
Source	Rating
AllMusic	4.5/5 stars
MusicHound Rock	4/5 stars

The NME review of the albums describes it as a "Grand filmic suite intended as the soundtrack to a "provocative film thriller set in Manchester's Moss Side" and that Moss Side Story is "one of the best soundtracks ever, the fact that it has no accompanying movie is a trifling irrelevance."

A retrospective review by Ritchie Unterberger of Allmusic described the album as "a sinister and edgy soundscape" that remained Adamson's best solo effort by far.

The album was included in the book 1001 Albums You Must Hear Before You Die.

== Accolades ==
Year	Publication	Country	Accolade	Rank
1989	NME	United Kingdom	"Albums of the Year"	34

== Track listing ==
All music composed by Barry Adamson; except "Everything Happens to Me" by Barry Adamson and Seamus Beaghen; "Alfred Hitchcock Presents" by Charles François Gounod and "The Man with the Golden Arm" by Elmer Bernstein.

Act one - 'The Ring's the Thing'

1. "On the Wrong Side of Relaxation" - 5:27
2. "Under Wraps" - 4:27
3. "Central Control" - 2:10
4. "Round Up the Usual Suspects" - 0:43

Act two - 'Real Deep Cool'

5. "Sounds from the Big House" - 6:24
6. "Suck on the Honey of Love" - 2:13
7. "Everything Happens to Me" - 2:43
8. "The Swinging Detective" - 5:45

Act three - 'The Final Irony'

9. "Autodestruction" - 3:49
10. "Intensive Care" - 2:42
11. "The Most Beautiful Girl in the World" - 4:07
12. "Free at Last" - 1:23

'For Your Ears Only'

13. "Alfred Hitchcock Presents" - 2:24
14. "Chocolate Milk Shake" - 4:24
15. "The Man with the Golden Arm" - 5:13

== Personnel ==
- Barry Adamson - All instruments except as noted, string arrangements, treatments, samples and sequencing
- Seamus Beaghen - Hammond organ on tracks: 2, 5, 6, 8, 9, 12, 15; piano on tracks: 2, 5 to 7, 11, 12, 15; rhythm guitar on tracks 2, 8; marimba track on 3
- Audrey Riley - cello on tracks: 1, 6, 11, 12
- Chris Tombling - violin on tracks: 1, 6, 11, 12
- Philippa Holland - violin on tracks: 1, 6, 12
- Sonia Slany - violin on tracks: 1, 6, 12
- Diamanda Galás - voice on "On the Wrong Side of Relaxation"
- Gary Barnacle - saxophone on "Sounds from the Big House"
- Marcia Schofield - keyboards, bass saxophone on "The Swinging Detective"
- Joe Sax - tenor saxophone on "The Swinging Detective"
- Rowland S. Howard - guitar on "Autodestruction"
- John Doyle - percussion on tracks 11, 15
- Annie Hogan - vibraphone on track 11; strings on track 15
- Chris Pitsillides - viola on track 11
- Enrico Tomasso - trumpet on track 15
- Freedom Choir - Anita Lane, Jessamy Calkin, Katy Beale, Kid Congo Powers, Mick Harvey - on tracks 6, 12
- Billy McGee - orchestration, string arrangements

Technical

- Paul Kendall - production assistance, recording engineer
- John Fryer, Paul Kendall - mixing
- Barry Adamson, Joe Ewart - art direction
- Lawrence Watson - photography

== Charts ==
Chart (1989)	Peak position
UK Indie Chart	9
