= Sketches from the Book of the Dead =

Studio album by Mick Harvey
- Released: 2011
- Studio: Grace Lane Studio and Atlantis Sound, Melbourne
- Genre: Pop, Rock
- Length: 41:00
- Label: Mute
- Producer: Mick Harvey

Mick Harvey chronology
Two of Diamonds (2007)	Sketches from the Book of the Dead (2011)	Four (2013)

Professional ratings
Aggregate scores
Source	Rating
Metacritic	70/100
Review scores
Source	Rating
Allmusic	4/5 stars

Sketches from the Book of the Dead is the fifth studio album by Australian singer-songwriter Mick Harvey, released in 2011 through Mute Records. The album is Harvey's first solo release following his departure from Nick Cave and The Bad Seeds in 2009 and the first to only feature original material. The album's songs explore the themes of death and passing, with "October Boy" being a homage to Harvey's former bandmate Rowland S. Howard, who died in 2009.

== Track listing ==
All tracks are written by Mick Harvey.

No.	Title	Length
1.	"October Boy"	3:27
2.	"The Ballad of Jay Givens"	5:08
3.	"Two Paintings"	3:49
4.	"Rhymeless"	3:14
5.	"Frankie T. & Frankie C."	4:04
6.	"A Place Called Passion"	4:15
7.	"To Each His Own"	2:14
8.	"The Bells Never Rang"	4:04
9.	"That's All, Paul"	3:11
10.	"How Would I Leave You?"	4:32
11.	"Famous Last Words"	2:36
Total length:		41:00

== Personnel ==
Credits adapted from the album's liner notes.

- Katrina Beale – paintings
- Mick Harvey – bass, composer, cover layout, guitar, organ, percussion, piano, producer, vocals
- David McCluney – engineer, mixing
- Gustav Pillig – cover painting
- Wez Prictor – mastering
- J.P. Shilo – accordion, guitar, violin
- P.A. Taylor – cover layout
- Xanthe Waite – backing vocals
- Rosie Westbrook – double bass
