= Stranger on the Sofa =

Studio album by Barry Adamson
- Released: 2006
- Genre: Indie rock Acid jazz Soul jazz Lounge; Slowcore; Dark wave
- Label: Central Control
- Producer: Barry Adamson

Barry Adamson chronology
| King of Nothing Hill (2002) | Stranger on the Sofa (2006) | Back to the Cat (2008) |

Professional ratings
Review scores
| Source | Rating |
|---|---|
| Allmusic | 4/5 stars |

Stranger on the Sofa is an album, released in 2006 on Central Control by audio/visual artist Barry Adamson. It received mass critical acclaim upon its release and features a single in the track "The Long Way Back Again".

== Track listing ==
All tracks composed and arranged by Barry Adamson

1. "Here in the Hole"
2. "The Long Way Back Again"
3. "Officer Bentley's Fairly Serious Dilemma"
4. "Who Killed Big Bird?"
5. "Theresa Green"
6. "The Sorrow and The Pity"
7. "My Friend The Fly"
8. "Inside of Your Head"
9. "You Sold Your Dreams"
10. "Deja Morte"
11. "Dissemble"
12. "Free Love"

Tracks 4, 6, 11, 12 are instrumentals

== Personnel ==
- Barry Adamson - performer, sleeve design, photography
- Anna Chancellor - narration (track 1)
- Nick Plytas - Hammond organ (tracks 2, 8)
- Adrian Owusu - lead guitar (track 3), slide guitar (tracks 2, 5, 9)
- Pascale Feuillée-Kendall - narration (track 10)
- Victor Van Vugt - additional production, mixing

== Critical reception ==
"As good as anything he has done. The bleak, dysfunctional cityscapes conjured are nightmarish" - Sunday Times Culture 4/5

"In sum, Stranger on the Sofa is the most fully realized Barry Adamson project ever. This is it. After decades of giving us good and even fine work, he's finally treated the faithful to a masterpiece" - Allmusic 4/5

"Proves once again what an unnerving space the interior of his head must be" - Mojo 4/5

"All over the place, swinging through dark pop, atmospheric instrumentals, and demented circus music... unique with great personality" - 7.5/10 Pitchforkmedia.com

"Original, unique and packed full of imagery, if this was a film, it would be the best you've ever seen" - The Sun 4/5

"All the songs are memorable, sometimes gorgeous, and always a strange amalgam of past and present influences" - Brainwashed.com

"This latest contains flashes of his finest work" - Uncut

"There's a perversely comforting Lynchian chill to the stygian sewer-funk of 'Dissemble' and the dub electronica of 'Free Love'" - Plan B Magazine

”Shtimulating stuff, Mish Moneypenny” - The Word Magazine (Plus "Who Killed Big Bird?" on covermount CD)

"By track 8, ‘the stranger’ is not only on your sofa, but taking his shoes off and polishing off your iced tea" - Okayplayer.com

"He succeeds beautifully in taking us to his haunted hotel lounge where the ghosts of the Cramps and Jimmy Webb jostle for space on the bandstand" - Beatmag.net
