= Intoxicated Man =

Studio album by Mick Harvey
- Released: 2 October 1995
- Recorded: Early 1995
- Studios: Sing Sing Studios and Metropolois Audio, Melbourne; Air Motion, Sydney; Townhouse 3, London
- Genre: Rock
- Length: 45:49
- Label: Mute
- Producers: Mick Harvey with Victor Van Vugt and Tony Cohen

Mick Harvey chronology
Intoxicated Man (1995)	Pink Elephants (1997)

Professional ratings
Review scores
Source	Rating
AllMusic	link

Intoxicated Man is the debut studio album by Mick Harvey, released on 2 October 1995. It is his first album of interpretations/translations of Serge Gainsbourg songs. The album is followed by Pink Elephants, Delirium Tremens, and Intoxicated Women.

== Track listing ==
All tracks are written by Serge Gainsbourg, except where noted.

No.	Title	Writer(s)	Translation	Length
1.	"69 Erotic Year"		Mick Harvey & Katy Beale	3:28
2.	"Harley Davidson"		Harvey	2:49
3.	"Intoxicated Man"		Harvey	2:42
4.	"The Sun Directly Overhead"		Alain Chamberlain & Harvey	2:59
5.	"Sex Shop"	Gainsbourg, Jean-Claude Vannier	Harvey	3:22
6.	"The Barrel of My 45"		Chamberlain & Harvey	2:15
7.	"Ford Mustang"		Harvey	2:21
8.	"Overseas Telegram"		Sarah Owen & Harvey	3:47
9.	"New York, U.S.A"		Chamberlain	2:28
10.	"Bonnie and Clyde"		Chamberlain & Harvey	4:02
11.	"Chatterton"		Chamberlain	2:07
12.	"Song of Slurs"	Gainsbourg, Vannier	Harvey & Beale	2:44
13.	"Jazz in the Ravine"		Chamberlain & Harvey	2:05
14.	"I Have Come to Tell You I'm Going"		Chamberlain & Harvey	2:55
15.	"Lemon Incest"		Chamberlain & Harvey	1:54
16.	"Initials B.B."		Harvey	3:51
Total length:				45:49

== Personnel ==
- Mick Harvey – vocals, guitar, bass guitar, organ, drums, percussion
- Anita Lane – vocals on "69 Erotic Year", "Harley Davidson", "Ford Mustang", "Overseas Telegram", "Bonnie and Clyde", and "Song of Slurs"
- Chris Hughes – drums
- Hugo Race – rhythm guitar
- Robin Casinader – piano
- James Cruickshank – organ
- David McClymont – bass guitar
- Loene Carmen – backing vocals on "New York, U.S.A." and "Initials B.B."
- Monica McMahon – backing vocals on "New York, U.S.A." and "Initials B.B."
- Bertrand Burgalat – string arrangements, vibraphone
- Eleanor Gilchrist, Chris Goldscheider, Jeremy Morris, Nickie Burton, Steve Bentley-Klein – violin
- Theresa Whipple – viola
- Abigail Trundle – cello

=== Technical ===
- P.A. Taylor – sleeve layout
- Katy Beale – photography
