= Pink Elephants =

Studio album by Mick Harvey
- Released: 27 October 1997
- Recorded: January 1995–January 1997
- Studio: Sing Sing and Metropolis, Melbourne; Air Motion, Sydney; Townhouse III, London
- Genre: Rock
- Length: 46:45
- Label: Mute
- Producer: Mick Harvey with Victor Van Vugt and Tony Cohen

Mick Harvey chronology
| Intoxicated Man (1995) | Pink Elephants (1997) | One Man's Treasure (2005) |

Professional ratings
Review scores
| Source | Rating |
|---|---|
| AllMusic | 4/5 stars |
| Entertainment Weekly | B |

Pink Elephants is the second studio album by Mick Harvey, released on 27 October 1997. The album is Harvey's second in his series of Serge Gainsbourg interpretations/translations, preceded by Intoxicated Man and followed by Delirium Tremens and Intoxicated Women.

== Reception ==
Entertainment Weekly wrote that "Harvey’s English versions of Gainsbourg songs maintain the latter’s lounge-lizard perversions, hilarious existential angst, and theatrical grandeur." Trouser Press called "I Love You...Nor Do I", the Anita Lane and Nick Cave duet, "erotic" and "the album’s centerpiece."

== Track listing ==
All tracks are written by Serge Gainsbourg, except where noted.

| No. | Title | Writer(s) | Translation | Length |
|---|---|---|---|---|
| 1. | "Pink Elephants" | Mick Harvey, Bertrand Burgalat | | 2:35 |
| 2. | "Requiem..." | Gainsbourg, Michel Colombier | Larry Norman, Pierre Gottfried Imhof, & Harvey | 2:35 |
| 3. | "The Javanaise" | | Harvey | 2:30 |
| 4. | "Black Seaweed" | | Norman, Imhof, & Harvey) | 2:21 |
| 5. | "Comic Strip" | | Bill Soly | 2:42 |
| 6. | "The Ticket Puncher" | | Harvey & Alain Chamberlain | 2:50 |
| 7. | "Non Affair" | | Norman, Imhof, & Harvey | 2:30 |
| 8. | "Scenic Railway" | | Norman, Imhof, & Harvey | 2:52 |
| 9. | "To All the Lucky Kids" | | Norman, Imhof, & Harvey | 3:53 |
| 10. | "Anthracite" | | Norman, Imhof, & Harvey | 2:20 |
| 11. | "Manon" | | Norman, Imhof, & Harvey | 2:20 |
| 12. | "I Love You...Nor Do I" | | Harvey | 4:38 |
| 13. | "The Ballad of Melody Nelson" | Gainsbourg, Jean-Claude Vannier | Sarah Owen & Harvey | 1:56 |
| 14. | "Torrey Canyon" | | Owen & Harvey | 3:12 |
| 15. | "Who Is 'In' Who Is 'Out" | | Harvey & Chamberlain | 3:14 |
| 16. | "Hotel Specific" | Gainsbourg, Jean-Claude Vannier | Harvey, Katy Beale, & Chamberlain | 3:42 |
| Total length: | | | | 46:45 |

== Personnel ==
- Mick Harvey – vocals, guitar, bass
- Anita Lane – vocals on "I Love You...Nor Do I" and "The Ballad of Melody Nelson"
- Nick Cave – vocals on "I Love You...Nor Do I"
- Chris Hughes – drums
- Nick Burton – violin
- Steve Bentley-Klein – violin
- James Cruickshank – organ, vocals
- David McClymont – bass
- Loene Carmen – backing vocals on "Torrey Canyon" and "Who Is 'In' Who Is 'Out'"
- Monica McMahon – backing vocals on "Torrey Canyon" and "Who Is 'In' Who Is 'Out'"
- Abigail Trundle – cello
- Bertrand Burgalat – string arrangements
- Kiernan Box – accordion on "The Javanaise"
- Eleanor Gilchrist – violin
- Theresa Whipple – viola
- Jeremy Morris – violin
- Sarah Beardsley – guitar

Technical

- P.A. Taylor – sleeve layout
- Katy Beale – photography
