= Two of Diamonds (album) =

Studio album by Mick Harvey
- Released: 23 April 2007
- Recorded: 18 October – 30 December 2006
- Studio: Grace Lane Studio and Atlantis Sound Recording Studios in Melbourne and The Instrument Studio in London, England
- Genre: Alternative rock
- Length: 39:52
- Label: Mute
- Producer: David McCluney, Kevin Paul, Mick Harvey

Mick Harvey chronology
One Man's Treasure (2005)	Two of Diamonds (2007)	Sketches from the Book of the Dead (2011)

Two of Diamonds is the fourth solo studio album by Australian singer-songwriter and multi-instrumentalist Mick Harvey, released on 23 April 2007 on Mute Records. The album contains both original compositions and covers and was recorded by Harvey over the course of three months in Grace Lane Studio, and later in Atlantis Sound Recording Studios, both in his native Melbourne and The Instrument Studio in London, England.

The album received positive reviews upon its release, with Pitchfork Media describing its material as "cutting like saws through the songs' solid underlying texture," however despite critical acclaim, Two of Diamonds failed to chart internationally. The album has sold under 100,000 copies worldwide.

== Background ==
In 2005, Mick Harvey's solo studio album, One Man's Treasure, received very positive critical acclaim and was followed by a successful tour in its promotion. Accompanied by his solo band, featuring Rosie Westbrook on double bass and fellow Bad Seeds' James Johnston on organ and guitar and Thomas Wydler on drums, Harvey began plans for his follow-up album. Harvey reflected on the plans, saying that "with [One Man's Treasure], I thought I'd see how comfortable it felt and if I liked what was going on [...] I enjoyed it and the live shows have become really strong over time. I didn't want One Man's Treasure to be a one off. I thought that if I did one record, I'd do a few. To make it something I was going to be doing for a while, for five years or so, to be something I'd follow through with and make substantial. The thing with any undertaking like this is that you grow into it. With the first album I was feeling my way somewhat and now I'm feeling more comfortable in this role. With the songs I'm just trying to find a point of view in there to convey ideas and feelings... elemental stuff."

== Recording ==
Two of Diamonds was recorded over the course of three months in late 2006 at three various locations throughout Australia and the United Kingdom. The initial recording sessions; recorded at Harvey's own recording facility, Grace Lane Studio, in Melbourne; featured double bassist Rosie Westbrook and resulted in rough versions of three of the album's songs: "Little Star," "Blue Arrows" and "Slow-Motion-Movie-Star." This session was produced and engineered solely by Harvey. A second recording session was held at The Instrument Studio, stylised as Instrument [studio], on 18 October. "Photograph" and "Everything is Fixed" were recorded with Rob Ellis, who produced albums for PJ Harvey with Harvey, Westbrook and then Bad Seed James Johnston. This session was produced and engineered by Kevin Paul. The final recording sessions for the album were held at Atlantis Sound Recording Studios over the course of two days in winter 2006. On 23 November, "Here I Am," "Sad Dark Eyes," "I Don't Want You on My Mind", "A Walk on the Wild Side," and "Out of Time Man" were recorded and featured Bad Seed Thomas Wydler on drums, also adding overdubs to "Photograph" from the sessions in London. On 30 December, the final two songs to be recorded were "No Doubt" and "Home is Far From Here." These sessions resulted in the bulk of the material featured on the album and were produced and engineered by David McCluney.

Following the final recording sessions, McCluney mixed the final version of the album at Atlantis Sound on 1, 3 and 5 January 2007. Wez Prictor (credited as Wez Prichter) was also assigned to master the album and receiving McCluney's final mixes, mastered the final version at The Finishing Post in Melbourne later that month.

== Composition ==
The album consists of an eclectic collection of songs which Harvey had chosen "to interoperate in his own distinctive and emotive style." Of the album's twelve tracks, two are original Harvey compositions ("Blue Arrows", "Little Star"). Alike One Man's Treasure, Harvey's originals are combined with "more obscure classics, sometimes stemming from the pens of well known enigmatic songwriters." Harvey has stated this his reasons for choosing such numbers for inclusion on the album was due to a profound personal connection with the songs. Some of the songs' lyrics refer directly to Harvey's past and the Australian musicians that have inspired him. "If I'm digging around, looking for material to use, that's very often where I'll find things that I'm interested in doing something with," said Harvey. "There is a lot of stuff there that is usable, because it's so unknown outside of Australia." "Sad Dark Eyes" was originally recorded by an Australian group from the mid-1960s, The Loved Ones. The song had previously been covered by Harvey when he was a member of The Birthday Party. "Photograph" is a song by Chris Bailey, of Brisbane-based punk band The Saints. The song was featured on their 1984 studio album, A Little Madness to Be Free. Bailey previously collaborated with Harvey whilst he was still in The Bad Seeds, Bailey was featured on backing vocals on the Nick Cave and the Bad Seeds single, "Bring It On", released in 2003 from Nocturama. "Everything Is Fixed" is from unreleased demo recordings by David McComb, formerly of the 1980s Australian band The Triffids. Harvey performs McComb's tale of a date "with pre destination in the jailhouse while sensitively backed every step of the way" James Cruickshank of The Cruel Sea is also seen as one of Harvey's influences, with his song "No Doubt", a song featured on Cruickshank's Hymn For Her, being an "ode to newfound love" "Home is Far From Here" references Crime and the City Solution, a band he formed in the mid-1980s and with whom he recorded six albums until the group disbanded in 1991. This song was previously featured on the album Shine.

However, songs by non-Australian artists are also featured on Two of Diamonds. "Slow-Motion-Movie-Star" is a song written by Harvey's friend PJ Harvey and an outtake from her 2001 album, Stories from the City, Stories from the Sea. "I Don't Want You on My Mind" was written by soul musician Bill Withers and "Here I Am" by Emmylou Harris. "Walk on the Wildside" was originally composed for the 1962 feature film adaptation of Nelson Algren's novel by Elmer Bernstein, with lyrics by Mack David, and performed by Brook Benton. "That's where the personal history comes in because it's always been an enormous frustration to me that the song is not on the soundtrack album," said Harvey. "I had to watch the film again to figure out the song. And then I added some lyrics. I think with every one of these songs on Two Of Diamonds, although there is probably an exception, I've added lyrics or changed lyrics. That's part of the process for me. I'm not really a 'cover versions man', where you do it all dutifully and perform an exact rendition. When I get to a part of a song that I don't think is right for me, I'll change it. You have to make it YOUR version. It also relates to the way old folk and blues songs used to evolve over time and would have different verses added or lost through the years. I’d like to think my approach is part of that tradition."

== Packaging ==
The cover art arranges the track listing in card suits.

Unlike Harvey's previous albums, Two of Diamonds does not feature a portrait of Harvey. The album cover features a selection of playing cards, including a joker, various suits of kings, queens, and jacks and centred is the eponymous two of diamonds. There were three design personnel assigned to design the cover for the album; Katy Beale, Marina Lutz and Harry Howard. Beale conceived the idea for, and designed, the front and back cover artwork while Lutz was head of image processing. Howard designed the final layout of the packaging. The back cover art arranges the album's track list in suits.

== Release ==
The album was released on 23 April 2007 and was issued on CD, Digipak and vinyl on Mute Records. Later versions were pressed in Europe by EMI and released in July 2007. Upon its initial release, Harvey toured throughout Europe to promote Two of Diamonds and included dates at All Tomorrow's Parties (ATP) in Somerset alongside Cat Power, Yann Tiersen, and also performed with Nick Cave and the Bad Seeds and on his tour with The Ritchie Success in Prague, Czech Republic on 10 May and 27 May at Bush Hall in London, United Kingdom. Due to recording sessions for Nick Cave and the Bad Seeds' studio album Dig, Lazarus, Dig!!!, Harvey's tour was limited to only a number of dates. The song "Out of Time Man" gained more popularity when it appeared in the pilot of Breaking Bad one year later.

== Reception ==
Professional ratings
Review scores
Source	Rating
Allmusic	4/5 stars
ARTISTdirect	3/5 stars
The A.V. Club	B+
Pitchfork Media	6.5/10
Popmatters	7/10 stars
Rock Sound	7/10
Stylus Magazine	B+

Critical reception to Two of Diamonds was positive. Pitchfork Media described the album's material as "cutting like saws through the songs solid underlying texture," and praised his original compositions as the stand-out songs of the album. ARTISTdirect were critical of the abundance of cover songs but stated that "Harvey possesses considerable skill as an interpreter and collaborator." Thom Jurek of Allmusic praised the mix of covers and origins, which he believed were mixed "strategically." He also praised the original compositions describing them as "among the finest songs Harvey's ever written" and the overall album as "sadly beautiful [...] and imprinted in the heart." Stylus Magazine summarized the album as "rich, textured, melancholy, and full of space" but like all reviews, focused on the inclusion of covers and originals; "his own originals are well crafted, sliding seamlessly into the proceedings, but the real triumph for Harvey is the fact that it all sounds like Mick Harvey, regardless of origin." Other sundry reviews noted Harvey's vocal abilities as "resonates beautifully in the arrangements that unfold meticulously and cinematically."

== Track listing ==
No.	Title	Writer(s)	Length
1.	"Photograph"	Chris Bailey	3:12
2.	"I Don't Want You on My Mind"	Bill Withers	3:53
3.	"Sad Dark Eyes"	Gerry Humphreys, Kim Lynch, Robert John Lovett, Treva Richards	2:57
4.	"Here I Am"	Emmylou Harris	3:26
5.	"Blue Arrows"	Mick Harvey	2:23
6.	"No Doubt"	Daniel Morphett, James Cruickshank	3:00
7.	"Everything is Fixed"	David McComb	4:29
8.	"A Walk on the Wild Side"	Elmer Bernstein, Mack David	3:04
9.	"Little Star"	Harvey	2:42
10.	"Slow-Motion-Movie-Star"	PJ Harvey	4:08
11.	"Out of Time Man"	Mano Negra	2:57
12.	"Home Is Far From Here"	Alexander Hacke, Bronwyn Adams, Thomas Stern, Mick Harvey	3:37
Total length:			39:52

== Personnel ==
Musicians

- Mick Harvey – vocals, electric guitar, acoustic guitar, bass, piano, keyboards, percussion
- Rosie Westbrook – double bass, backing vocals (on "Here I Am" and "Out of Time Man")
- James Johnston – electric guitar, acoustic guitar, organ
- Thomas Wydler – drums
- Rob Ellis – additional drums
- Julitha Ryan – additional piano, backing vocals (on "Out of Time Man")

Technical personnel

- David McCluney – Record producer, engineer, mixing
- Kevin Paul – producer, engineer (on "Photograph" and "Everything is Fixed")
- Mick Harvey – producer, engineer (on "Blue Arrows," "Little Star" and "Slow-Motion-Movie-Star")
- Wez Prictor (credited as "Wez Prichter") – mastering

Design personnel

- Katy Beale – design, artwork
- Marina Lutz – image processing
- Harry Howard – design, layout
