= Oedipus Schmoedipus =

Studio album by Barry Adamson
- Released: 1996
- Studios: GT Eden; Worldwide, London
- Genre: Art rock
- Label: Mute
- Producer: Barry Adamson

Barry Adamson chronology
Soul Murder (1992)	Oedipus Schmoedipus (1996)	As Above, So Below (1998)

Oedipus Schmoedipus is an album by the English musician Barry Adamson, released in 1996. Like Adamson's previous albums, Oedipus Schmoedipus was conceived as a soundtrack to an imaginary film. The album peaked at No. 51 on the UK Albums Chart.

"Something Wicked This Way Comes" appears in the David Lynch film Lost Highway.

== Production ==
The album was produced by Adamson. Nick Cave cowrote and contributed vocals to "The Sweetest Embrace", while Jarvis Cocker cowrote and sang on "Set the Controls for the Heart of the Pelvis". Billy Mackenzie sang on "Achieved in the Valley of Dolls".

== Critical reception ==
Professional ratings
Review scores
Source	Rating
AllMusic	4/5 stars
The Encyclopedia of Popular Music	4/5 stars
MusicHound Rock: The Essential Album Guide	4.5/5 stars
Muzik	5/5 stars
NME	7/10
Pitchfork	8.1/10

NME called the album "too cool to be cringingly kitsch, too deep to be flaky." Pitchfork stated that, "with 13 tracks that sound like they could take form and commit acts of homicide on their own, the former Bad Seed's creation is undeniably ... alive."

The Guardian determined that "Adamson's psychogeographical soundtracks snag your head and won't let go: he's made a (bad) dream of a music that simulates mainstream accessibility but is drenched with the maker's own terrors, memories, fixations." Rolling Stone thought that "Adamson can brilliantly—and without words—suggest entire movie scenes with dizzying combinations of dance beats, jazz phrases, finger-snapping big-band arrangements, luscious strings and even references to '60s French pop."

AllMusic wrote that "Adamson's skill in layering and devising unusual sound textures still qualifies him as one of experimental rock's more imaginative composers and producers." Dave Thompson referred to the album as a "supreme slab of disturbance-with-a-(bit of a)-beat."

== Track listing ==
All tracks composed by Barry Adamson, except where noted.

No.	Title	Writer(s)	Length
1.	"Set the Controls for the Heart of the Pelvis"	Adamson, Jarvis Cocker	5:37
2.	"Something Wicked This Way Comes"	Adamson, Adrian Thaws, Andrew Vowles, Charles Blackwell, Grant Marshall, Harry Middlebrooks, Jacques Datin, Maurice Vidalin, Mike Shapiro, Robert Del Naja	4:32
3.	"The Vibes Ain't Nothin' but the Vibes"		4:48
4.	"It's Business as Usual"	Adamson, Carla Bozulich, John Napier	4:28
5.	"Miles"	Miles Davis	5:26
6.	"Dirty Barry"		7:25
7.	"In a Moment of Clarity"		4:12
8.	"Achieved in the Valley of Dolls"	Adamson, Billy Mackenzie	4:26
9.	"Vermillion Kisses"		3:02
10.	"The Big Bamboozle"		3:33
11.	"State of Contraction"		1:37
12.	"The Sweetest Embrace"	Adamson, Nick Cave	4:46
13.	"Set the Controls Again"		1:32

== Personnel ==
- Barry Adamson – lead vocals
- Mark De Lane Lea, Ken Low – guitar
- Richard Hand – classical guitar
- Jarvis Cocker – vocals on "Set the Controls for the Heart of the Pelvis"
- Billy Mackenzie – vocals on "Achieved in the Valley of Dolls"
- Nick Cave – vocals on "The Sweetest Embrace"
- Seamus Beaghen – Hammond organ, piano
- Pete Wyman – saxophone, clarinet
- Ileana Ruhemann – alto flute
- Carla Bozulich, John Napier – voice overs on "It's Business As Usual"
- Miranda Gooch – storyteller on "Vermillion Kisses"
- Beverley Skeete, Chantel Mapp, Roy Hamilton, Zeeteah Massiah – backing vocals
- Atticus Ross – programming and sounds on tracks 1–6
- Ivor Wimborne – additional programming
- Audrey Riley, Billy McGee – string arrangements

Technical

- Kevin Petrie – recording
- Barry Adamson, Simon Henwood – sleeve concept
- Steve Gullick – cover photography, still from Philippe Garrel's Le Révélateur
