= Delirium Tremens (Mick Harvey album) =

Studio album by Mick Harvey
- Released: 24 June 2016
- Recorded: 2015
- Studios: Birdland Studios, Prahran, Victoria; Candy Bomber Studio, Berlin; CBE Studio, Paris
- Genre: Rock
- Length: 40:00
- Label: Mute
- Producer: Mick Harvey

Mick Harvey chronology
Four (Acts of Love) (2013)	Delirium Tremens (2016)	Intoxicated Women (2017)

Professional ratings
Review scores
Source	Rating
Allmusic	link

Delirium Tremens is the seventh studio album by Mick Harvey, released on 24 June 2016. It is Harvey's third album in his series of Serge Gainsbourg interpretations and translations. The album was preceded by Intoxicated Man in 1995 and Pink Elephants in 1997, and followed by Intoxicated Women in 2017.

== Track listing ==
All tracks are written by Serge Gainsbourg, except "I Envisage", written by Alain Bashung and Serge Gainsbourg, and "The Decadance", written by Addie Brik and Serge Gainsbourg. All lyrics translated by Mick Harvey.

No.	Title	Length
1.	"The Man With the Cabbage Head" (L'Homme à tête de chou)	2:46
2.	"Deadly Tedium" (Ce Mortel Ennui)	2:46
3.	"Coffee Colour" (Couleur Café)	2:13
4.	"The Convict's Song" (Chanson du forçat)	3:43
5.	"SS C'est Bon" (Est-ce est-ce si bon?)	2:50
6.	"I Envisage" (J'envisage)	6:31
7.	"A Day Like Any Other" (Un jour comme un autre)	2:08
8.	"A Violent Poison (That's What Love Is)" (Un Poison Violent, C'est Ça L'Amour)	2:38
9.	"More and More, Less and Less" (De plus en plus, de moins en moins)	2:38
10.	"Don't Say a Thing" (Ne dis rien)	3:07
11.	"Boomerang"	3:09
12.	"The Decadance" (La décadanse)	5:35
Total length:		40:00

== Personnel ==
Credits adapted from the album's liner notes

- Mick Harvey – design concept, cover photography, guitars, keyboards, collage layout, organ, piano, string arrangements, translation, vocals
- Katy Beale – vocals on "The Decadance"
- Bertrand Burgalat – bass, piano, string arrangements
- Hugo Cran – drums
- Toby Dammit – bongos, drums, vibraphone
- Glenn Lewis – bass
- Jessica Ribeiro – backing vocals
- Yoyo Röhm – guitar, piano
- Julitha Ryan – backing vocals
- Steve Shelley – shaker
- J.P. Shilo – accordion, guitars, noise, organ, percussion, slide guitar, vocals, backing vocals
- Lyndelle-Jayne Spruyt – translation assistant, backing vocals
- Xanthe Waite – vocals on "A Day Like Any Other" and "Don't Say a Thing," backing vocals
- Dahlia Adamopoulos, Vincent Catulescu, Biddy Connor, Pauline Hauswirth, Bronwyn Henderson, Anouk Ross, Lizzy Walsh – strings

Technical

- Brenton Conlan, Ingo Krauss – engineer
- David Mestre – French strings engineer
- Lindsay Gravina – mixing
