= Four (Acts of Love) =

Studio album by Mick Harvey
- Released: June 11, 2013
- Studio: Grace Lane Studio and Atlantis Sound, Melbourne
- Genre: Pop, Rock
- Length: 33:03
- Label: Mute
- Producer: Mick Harvey

Mick Harvey chronology
Sketches from the Book of the Dead (2011)	Four (Acts of Love) (2013)	Delirium Tremens (2016)

Professional ratings
Aggregate scores
Source	Rating
Metacritic	70/100
Review scores
Source	Rating
Allmusic	4/5 stars
Clash	9/10
Record Collector	4/5 stars
Blurt Magazine	4/5 stars
Drowned in Sound	7/10
MusicOMH	3.5/5 stars
PopMatters	6/10

Four (Acts of Love) is the sixth studio album by Australian singer-songwriter Mick Harvey, released on 11 June 2013 through Mute Records. The album is Harvey's second following his departure from Nick Cave & The Bad Seeds. The tracks make up a song cycle exploring the process of falling in love, bookended by "Praise the Earth (Wheels of Amber and Gold)" and "Praise the Earth (An Ephemeral Play)". The album includes several covers, including The Saints' punk "The Story of Love", P. J. Harvey's "Glorious" – who also duets with Harvey on the track – and Van Morrison's "The Way Young Lovers Do" off Astral Weeks.

== Track listing ==
All tracks are written by Mick Harvey, except where noted.

Act 1 - Summertime In New York
No.	Title	Writer(s)	Length
1.	"Praise the Earth (Wheels of Amber and Gold)"	Based on a hymn by Bishop R. Heber	2:12
2.	"Glorious"	P. J. Harvey	3:27
3.	"Midnight and the Ramparts"		2:16
4.	"Summertime in New York"	Tony McKay	3:15
5.	"Where There's Smoke (Before)"		1:26

Act 2 - The Story Of Love
No.	Title	Writer(s)	Length
6.	"God Made the Hammer"		2:39
7.	"I Wish That I Were Stone"		1:34
8.	"The Way Young Lovers Do"	Van Morrison	2:48
9.	"A Drop, An Ocean"		1:14
10.	"The Story of Love"	Ed Kuepper	3:35

Act 3 - Wild Hearts Run Out Of Time
No.	Title	Writer(s)	Length
11.	"Where There's Smoke (After)"		1:32
12.	"Wild Hearts"	Roy Orbison, Will Jennings	3:53
13.	"Fairy Dust"		1:44
14.	"Praise the Earth (An Ephemeral Play)"		4:08

== Personnel ==
- Mick Harvey – vocals, keyboards, drums, percussion, acoustic guitar, electric guitar, photography
- J.P. Shilo – electric guitar, violin
- Rosie Westbrook – double bass

Technical

- David McCluney – engineer
