= Death Is Not the End (song) =

Song by Bob Dylan

from the album Down in the Groove
- Recorded: May 2, 1983
- Studio: Power Station (New York)
- Length: 5:06
- Label: Columbia
- Songwriter: Bob Dylan

"Death Is Not the End" is a song by American singer-songwriter Bob Dylan. It was released as the fourth track from his twenty-fifth studio album Down in the Groove (1988). Stemming from the sessions for Infidels (1983), the song features Mark Knopfler on guitar and backing vocals from hip-hop group Full Force. Despite receiving mixed reviews from biographers and critics, the song has been covered many times by artists including Nick Cave, Carl Broemel and the Waterboys.

== Overview ==
According to biographer Clinton Heylin, "Death Is Not the End" was recorded in a single take on May 2, 1983, at the Power Station in New York City. Though the song did not appear on the Infidels album which was being recorded at the time, it was copyrighted eight days after its recording. It was not included in the track listing for Down in the Groove until late in production, where it and "Had a Dream About You, Baby" were added to replace covers of Slim Harpo's "Got Love If You Want It" and John Hiatt's "The Usual". The version on the record is an edit of the take, with the full-length version later being released in 2021 on Springtime in New York: The Bootleg Series, Vol. 16 (1980-1985).

Writer Brian Hinton likens "Death Is Not the End" to Dylan's earlier Christian work, though in comparison to those songs, its "chorus is sung in hope rather than joyous anticipation." Both Heylin and Hinton note darker lyrics towards the song's conclusion, with Hinton arguing it "becom[es] more apocalyptic when afforded a close listen." Hinton also posits that the track's inclusion on Down in the Groove lends credence to fellow writer Howard Sounes' assertion that its parent album is a meditation on "alienation, ageing and death". Spectrum Culture also argues that the song harkens back to Dylan's born-again period, comparing it to Saved (1980).

== Reception and legacy ==
"Death Is Not the End" has received a mixed reception from critics and biographers. Spectrum Culture ranked it as one of Dylan's 20 best songs of the 1980s, considering it one of the stronger tracks on an album typically regarded among Dylan's worst. In 1991, Rolling Stone writer Mikal Gilmore listed it among Dylan's "best modern songs". In a review of Down in the Groove for that same publication, David Fricke praised the song's "striking, understated spirituality". Conversely, Heylin disparaged it as a "dirge" which "meander[s] monotonously", questioning Dylan's decision to include it on Down to the Groove while other Infidels outtakes such as "Blind Willie McTell" and "Foot of Pride" remained unreleased. Michael Gray dismissed it as "risibly turgid" track which was "rightly rejected" from Infidels. Oliver Trager similarly called the song "turgid", opining that it "didn't languish in the can long enough" and that it sounds "as if Dylan were deliberately writing a song to sound like somebody else".

A performance of the song by Nick Cave (featuring Anita Lane, Shane MacGowan, PJ Harvey and Kylie Minogue) appears as the closing track on his album Murder Ballads (1996). This rendition was praised by Kory Grow of Rolling Stone Australia as a "warm-and-fuzzy campfire singalong", as well as a "sweet and sentimental palette cleanser" after the "bloody massacre" of the rest of the album. Spectrum Culture argued that Cave's rendition is superior to Dylan's original, stating that while Dylan "provided the blueprint", Cave turned it into a "masterpiece" which "cashes in on [its] full potential". Other cover versions have been performed by Carl Broemel of My Morning Jacket and the Waterboys.

== Personnel ==
Adapted from the album liner notes:

- Bob Dylan – vocals, guitar, harmonica
- Mark Knopfler – guitar
- Robbie Shakespeare – bass
- Sly Dunbar – drums
- Alan Clarke – keyboards
- Clydie King – background vocals
- Full Force – background vocals
