= Kak Channthy =

Cambodian singer

Kak Channthy (c.1980 – 20 March 2018) was a Cambodian singer and vocalist of the band Cambodian Space Project. She has been described as the "Cambodian Amy Winehouse". She died in 2018 in a car accident.

== Biography ==
Channthy was born the only daughter of army tank driver Reach Lon, and grew up poor in Prey Veng Province, a rural area in Cambodia, before moving to Phnom Penh. While singing in bars in Phnom Penh, an Australian musician named Julien Poulson discovered her—the two would later marry. The pair formed the Cambodian psychedelic rock band "The Cambodian Space Project", released five albums, and toured 24 countries around the world.

Inspired by Cambodian singers of the 1960s and early 1970s, "Cambodia's golden age", Cambodian Space Project led an arts and cultural revival in Cambodia and was one of the few Cambodian rock bands to find success outside of their own country. Channthy collaborated with a range of artists including Dennis Coffey, on their third LP, "Whisky Cambodia". She twice recorded duets with Australian poet laureate Paul Kelly: on "The Boat" in 2013 and a re-working of Lee Hazlewood and Nancy Sinatra's song "Summer Wine" in 2017. Channthy was fond of French chanson and collaborated with Bad Seed Mick Harvey on the Serge Gainsbourg track "Contact", as well as covering and regularly performing France Gall's classic "Laisse Tomber Les Filles" in her live set.

Kak Channthy and her then-husband Julien Poulson were the subject of a BBC Storyville documentary Rise of a Pop Diva, a program also released to cinema as the documentary The Cambodian Space Project. She also had several side-projects including Australian Khmer hip hop group Astronomy Class with whom she recorded and released the album "Mekong Delta Sunrise" and in 2016 she formed all Khmer band "Channthy Cha-Cha" in which she experimented with romantic Khmer ballads from artists such as Sinn Sisamouth and Pen Ran, adding a funk twist.

She died in March 2018 at the age of 38 when the auto rickshaw she was travelling in was hit by a car. The driver who caused the collision was charged with negligent driving causing unintentional injury and death.

== Discography ==
Cambodian Space Project were signed to Australian independent music label FOUR FOUR.

- 2011: A Space Odyssey (2011)
- Not Easy Rock & Roll (2012)
- Whisky Cambodia (2014)
- Radio Cambodia (2015)
- Electric Blue Boogaloo (2015)
- Spaced-Out in Wonderland (2017)
