= Soul Murder =

Studio album by Barry Adamson
- Released: 6 April 1992
- Studio: Worldwide Studios, London; Konk Studios, London
- Genre: Electronica, jazz
- Length: 46:53
- Label: Mute
- Producer: Barry Adamson

Barry Adamson chronology
Moss Side Story (1988)	Soul Murder (1992)	Oedipus Schmoedipus (1996)

Professional ratings
Review scores
Source	Rating
AllMusic	3/5 stars
The Encyclopedia of Popular Music	4/5 stars
MusicHound Rock	4/5 stars

Soul Murder is a 1992 album by Barry Adamson. The album was nominated for the 1992 Mercury Prize.

== Reception ==
Trouser Press called the album "a sketchbook of often brilliant ideas — crime jazz, sinewy dance, smoky bossa nova — all peppered with strange samples . . . and spoken-word bits."

== Track listing ==
All tracks composed and arranged by Barry Adamson; except where indicated

No.	Title	Writer(s)	Length
1.	"Preface" (featuring Robert Fripp)		1:13
2.	"Split"		3:58
3.	"The Violation of Expectation"		3:04
4.	"Suspicion"	Mort Shuman, Doc Pomus	4:05
5.	"A Gentle Man of Colour"		3:50
6.	"Trance of Hatred"		0:59
7.	"Checkpoint Charlie"		6:32
8.	"Reverie"		4:51
9.	"Un Petit Miracle"	Barry Adamson, Pascale Fuillée-Kendall	2:55
10.	"007, a Phantasy Bond Theme"	Monty Norman	3:57
11.	"The Adamson Family"		3:45
12.	"Cool Green World"		3:31
13.	"On the Edge of Atonement"	Barry Adamson, Atticus Ross	3:16
14.	"Epilogue"

== Personnel ==
- Barry Adamson - bass, keyboards, vocals, narration
- Kevin Armstrong - guitar (tracks 7, 12)
- Lynn Baker - viola (tracks 6, 9, 11, 13)
- Malcolm Baxter - trumpet (tracks 2, 10)
- Sarah Brown - choir vocals (track 13)
- Patricia Knight - choir vocals (track 13)
- Ann Lines - cello (tracks 6, 9, 11, 13)
- Billy McGee - conductor, string arrangements (tracks 6, 9, 11, 13)
- Arthur Nichols - narrator (track 10)
- Audrey Riley - cello (tracks 6, 9, 11, 13)
- Marcia Schofield - narrator (track 5)
- Enrico Tomasso - trumpet (tracks 2, 10)
- Chris Tombling - violin (tracks 6, 9, 11, 13)
- Anne Berland - vocals (track 7)
- Deloray Campbell - choir vocals (track 13)
- Peter Francis - choir vocals (track 13)
- Caron Richards - choir vocals (track 13)
- Steve Shaw - trumpet (tracks 2, 10)
- Maria Zastrow - narrator (track 6)
- Jonathan Carney - violin (tracks 6, 9, 11, 13)
- Phil Brown - bass trombone (tracks 2, 10)
- Clive Dobbins - violin (tracks 6, 9, 11, 13)
- Pete Whyman - alto & tenor saxophone (tacks 2, 10)
- Chris Pitsillides - viola (tracks 6, 9, 11, 13)
- Joe Parker - violin (tracks 6, 9, 11, 13)

Technical

- Stan Loubières - recording, mixing
- Celia Johnstone - front cover photography
