= One Man's Treasure =

Studio album by Mick Harvey
- Released: 29 August 2005
- Recorded: February 2005
- Studio: Grace Lane and Atlantis Studios, Melbourne
- Genre: Rock
- Length: 47:28
- Label: Mute
- Producer: Mick Harvey

Mick Harvey chronology
Pink Elephants (1997)	One Man's Treasure (2005)	Two of Diamonds (2007)

Professional ratings
Review scores
Source	Rating
Allmusic	4/5 stars

One Man's Treasure is the third studio album by Mick Harvey, released on 29 August 2005. It is considered Harvey's first solo album as it is his first release to feature several original composititons, with his preceding albums consisting of Serge Gainsbourg interpretations. The album includes songs written by Harvey and musicians he had produced and/or performed with, including Nick Cave, Tex, Don and Charlie, Kim Salmon, Bambi Lee Savage and Bruno Adams.

== Track listing ==
No.	Title	Writer(s)	Length
1.	"First St. Blues"	Lee Hazlewood	3:56
2.	"Come Into My Sleep"	Nick Cave	3:46
3.	"Louise"	Don Walker	4:34
4.	"Come On Spring"	Dave Faulkner, Justin Frew, Stuart McCarthy, Kim Salmon	4:20
5.	"Demon Alcohol"	Bambi Lee Savage	3:41
6.	"Man Without a Home"	Mick Harvey	3:46
7.	"Planetarium"	Bruno Adams, Chris Hughes, Chris Russell, Ollie Peters	4:02
8.	"The River"	Tim Buckley	3:08
9.	"Hank Williams Said It Best"	Guy Clark	4:03
10.	"Bethelridge"	Robbie Fulks	4:35
11.	"Mother of Earth"	Jeffrey Lee Pierce	3:33
12.	"Will You Surrender?"	Harvey	4:04
Total length:			47:28

== Personnel ==
- Helen Mountfort – cello
- Jason Bunn – voila
- Andrea Keeble, Robin Casinader, Suzanne Simpson – violin

Technical

- David McCluney – mixing
- Harry Howard – cover layout
- Wendy Joy Morrissey – photography
