= Down in the Groove =

Studio album by Bob Dylan
- Released: May 30, 1988
- Recorded: 1983–1987
- Genre: Rock
- Length: 32:04
- Label: Columbia

Bob Dylan chronology
Knocked Out Loaded (1986)	Down in the Groove (1988)	Dylan & the Dead (1989)

Bob Dylan studio album chronology
Knocked Out Loaded (1986)	Down in the Groove (1988)	Oh Mercy (1989)

Singles from Down in the Groove
- 1. "Silvio" Released: July 1988

Down in the Groove is the twenty-fifth studio album by American singer-songwriter Bob Dylan. It was released on May 30, 1988, through Columbia Records. The album was recorded over a period of five years, spanning the sessions for Infidels (1983) to recordings made specifically for the album in 1987. The record, which is made up of both originals and covers, features multiple guest musicians including Ronnie Wood, hip-hop group Full Force, and members of the Grateful Dead, while two of the album's four originals were co-written with Grateful Dead lyricist Robert Hunter.

Following up on the poorly-received Knocked Out Loaded (1986), Down in the Groove was released to similarly negative reviews and low sales. The album stalled at number 61 in the US and number 32 in the UK, while its only single, "Silvio", failed to chart in either territory. Both contemporary and retrospective reviews criticize the album as having an incohesive and scattered nature, and rankings of Dylan's work tend to place the album near the bottom of his discography.

== Recording and reception ==
Professional ratings
Review scores
Source	Rating
AllMusic	2/5 stars
Robert Christgau	C+
The Encyclopedia of Popular Music	2/5 stars
Entertainment Weekly	C+
MusicHound	1.5/5 stars
Rolling Stone	2.5/5 stars
The Rolling Stone Album Guide	2/5 stars

"Even by Dylan standards, this album has had a strange, difficult birth", wrote Rolling Stone critic David Fricke. "Its release was delayed for more than half a year, and the track listing was altered at least three times. If the musician credits are any indication, the songs that made the final cut come from half a dozen different recording sessions spread out over six years." Like its predecessor Knocked Out Loaded, Dylan once again used more collaborators than normal.

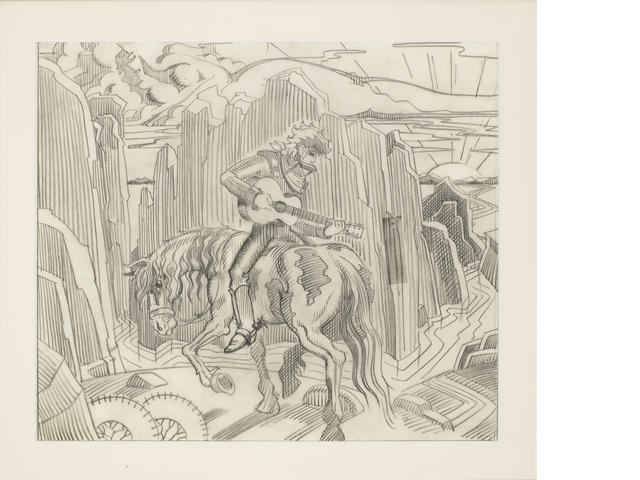
Rick Griffin's original design for the cover of Down in the Groove.

In a review published in his Consumer Guide column, Robert Christgau wrote, "Where Self Portrait was at least weird, splitting the difference between horrible and hilarious, [Dylan is now] forever professional—not a single remake honors or desecrates the original. All he can do to a song is Dylanize it, and thus his Danny Kortchmar band and his Steve Jones–Paul Simonon band are indistinguishable, immersed in that patented and by now meaningless one-take sound." Christgau would later call Down in the Groove "horrendous product".

Recently coming off of the album Knocked Out Loaded, Dylan took the opportunity to further work on his collaborative efforts. The album features several guest appearances for the first time. Most prominent was the appearance of The Grateful Dead, who provided the album with one of its notable high spots with the single "Silvio". The track was later included on Bob Dylan's Greatest Hits Volume 3 and The Essential Bob Dylan.

As stated in the Encyclopedia of Popular Music, the album shares no single recording session. This created a tone that the Encyclopedia described as, "raucous to pensive to sombre in a heartbeat."

In the book Bob Dylan: The Recording Sessions, 1960–1994, author Clinton Heylin offers an explanation for the style and layout of the album's tracks. He states, "As it is, Dylan's intent all along may have been to show the rich vein of music he listened to when growing up in Hibbing." The author goes on further to describe how the album was a sensible step for Dylan, suggesting his issues with creative writing had hampered his ability to produce new material.

A unique aspect of the album was the "garage rock"-type tour that followed. Dylan's previous tour had placed a heavy emphasis on guest appearances to allow for a more variety-themed show. The intimate nature of the smaller band allowed the artists to interpret songs differently each time they played. Often the performances held little resemblance to prior shows.

In his review for Rolling Stone magazine, Fricke noted that "a highly anticipated—if somewhat unlikely—collaboration with Full Force, the top Brooklyn hip-hop posse, turned out to be an old Infidels outtake, 'Death Is Not the End,' newly garnished with some tasty but rather superfluous Full Force vocal harmonies." "Death Is Not the End" was covered by Nick Cave in 1996.

In 2007, Rolling Stone labeled Down in the Groove as Bob Dylan's worst album. In 2017, the magazine added that "Dylan fans will forever argue about the precise moment when [Dylan's] career hit rock-bottom but most pin it somewhere around the time that Down in the Groove landed with a thud in record stores in May 1988."

Artist Rick Griffin, primarily known for the Grateful Dead's logos and poster art, was commissioned to design the cover of the record jacket. Griffin's drawing of a man playing a guitar while riding a horse backwards was rejected by Columbia Records who instead used a photograph of Dylan.

Nick Cave covered "Death is not the End", with Shane MacGovan, PJ Harvey and Kylie Minogue guesting on the song, on his hit album Murder Ballads.

== Tour ==
Soon after Down in the Groove's release, Dylan embarked on a summer tour of North America, presumably in support of the album. The first show was on June 7, 1988, at Concord Pavilion in Concord, California, and it was a dramatic shift from previous tours. In recent years, Dylan had relied on larger ensembles, often staffed with high-profile artists like Mick Taylor, Ian McLagan, the Grateful Dead and Tom Petty and the Heartbreakers. This time, Dylan organized his concerts around a small, "garage rock"-type combo, consisting of guitarist G.E. Smith (of Saturday Night Live fame), bassist Kenny Aaronson and drummer Christopher Parker. (There was a notable exception in the early June shows; those concerts featured a second, lead guitarist in Neil Young, whose own career was also in a downturn at the time.)

Song selection also became more adventurous, with setlists from different nights offering little resemblance to one another. The concerts would also alternate between full-band, electric sets and smaller, acoustic sets (with G.E. Smith providing Dylan's only accompaniment); it was during the acoustic sets that Dylan incorporated an endless variety of traditional cover songs, a marked departure from previous shows that depended heavily on his own compositions.

The concerts initially received modest attention, but they would soon receive a generous amount of praise. The tour schedule was also surprising for a man of Dylan's age, as Dylan was spending most of his time on the road. Just as one leg of the tour would end, Dylan would schedule another leg soon after, and this would continue for many years to come. As a result, Dylan's shows are now often referred to as the "Never Ending Tour". Though the supporting personnel would undergo a number of changes for years to come, the basic format begun in the summer of 1988 would continue to this day.

== Track listing ==
Side one
No.	Title	Writer(s)	Length
1.	"Let's Stick Together"	Wilbert Harrison	3:09
2.	"When Did You Leave Heaven?"	Walter Bullock, Richard Whiting	2:15
3.	"Sally Sue Brown"	Arthur June Alexander, Earl Montgomery, Tom Stafford	2:29
4.	"Death Is Not the End"	Bob Dylan	5:10
5.	"Had a Dream About You, Baby"	Dylan	2:53
Total length:			15:56

Side two
No.	Title	Writer(s)	Length
1.	"Ugliest Girl in the World"	Dylan, Robert Hunter	3:32
2.	"Silvio"	Dylan, Hunter	3:05
3.	"Ninety Miles an Hour (Down a Dead End Street)"	Hal Blair, Don Robertson	2:56
4.	"Shenandoah"	Traditional, arranged by Dylan	3:38
5.	"Rank Strangers to Me"	Albert E. Brumley	2:57
Total length:			16:08

== Personnel ==
Adapted from the album liner notes.

- Bob Dylan – guitar, harmonica, keyboards, vocals; production on "Death Is Not the End"
- Mike Baird – drums on "Silvio"
- Peggi Blu – backing vocals on "Shenandoah"
- Alexandra Brown – backing vocals on "Shenandoah"
- Eric Clapton – guitar
- Alan Clark – keyboards on "Death Is Not the End"
- Carolyn Dennis – backing vocals on "Ugliest Girl in the World" and "Shenandoah"; additional vocals on "Silvio"
- Sly Dunbar – drums on "Death Is Not the End"
- Nathan East – bass guitar on "Silvio" and "Shenandoah"
- Mitchell Froom – keyboards on "Had a Dream About You, Baby"
- Full Force – backing vocals on "Death Is Not the End"
- Jerry Garcia – additional vocals on "Silvio"
- Willie Green, Jr. – backing vocals on "Sally Sue Brown" and "Ninety Miles an Hour (Down a Dead End Street)"
- Myron Grombacher – drums on "Sally Sue Brown"
- Beau Hill – keyboards on "Had a Dream About You, Baby"
- Randy Jackson – bass guitar on "Let's Stick Together" and "Ugliest Girl in the World"
- Steve Jones – guitar on "Sally Sue Brown"
- Steve Jordan – drums on "Let's Stick Together" and "Ugliest Girl in the World"
- Danny Kortchmar – guitar on "Let's Stick Together" and "Ugliest Girl in the World"
- Bobby King – backing vocals on "Sally Sue Brown" and "Ninety Miles an Hour (Down a Dead End Street)"
- Clydie King – backing vocals on "Death Is Not the End"
- Larry Klein – bass guitar on "Rank Strangers to Me"
- Mark Knopfler – guitar and production on "Death Is Not the End"
- Brent Mydland – additional vocals on "Silvio"
- Madelyn Quebec – keyboards and backing vocals on "When Did You Leave Heaven?" and "Ninety Miles an Hour (Down a Dead End Street)"; vocals on "Sally Sue Brown"; backing vocals on "Ugliest Girl in the World" and "Shenandoah"; additional vocals on "Silvio"
- Pamela Quinlan – backing vocals
- Kevin Savigar – keyboards on "Sally Sue Brown"
- Robbie Shakespeare – bass guitar on "Death Is Not the End"
- Stephen Shelton – drums on "When Did You Leave Heaven?", keyboards on "Ugliest Girl in the World", engineering, mixing
- Paul Simonon – bass guitar on "Sally Sue Brown"
- Henry Spinetti – drums on "Had a Dream About You, Baby"
- Mick Taylor – guitar on "Death is Not the End"
- Bob Weir – additional vocals on "Silvio"
- Kip Winger – bass guitar on "Had a Dream About You, Baby"
- Ronnie Wood – bass guitar on "Had a Dream About You, Baby"

=== Production ===
- Coke Johnson – engineering
- Mike Kloster – assistant engineering
- Jeff Musel – assistant engineering
- Jimmy Preziosi – assistant engineering
- Brian Soucy – assistant engineering
