= Sex O'Clock (album) =

Studio album by Anita Lane
- Released: 24 September 2001
- Recorded: August 1999 (vocals); May 2000 (strings and vocals)
- Studios: AAV, Melbourne, Australia (loops); Abbey Road Studios, London, England, UK (drums); Atlantis Studios, Melbourne, Australia; The Instrument, London, England, UK (vocals); Tricatel, Paris, France
- Genre: Pop
- Length: 44:31
- Language: English
- Label: Mute
- Producer: Mick Harvey

Anita Lane chronology
Yadi Yadi (1995)	Sex O'Clock (2001)

Sex O'Clock is the second studio album by Australian musician Anita Lane, released on 24 September 2001. It was Lane's final album before her retirement from recording and her death 20 years later. Produced by Mick Harvey of the Bad Seeds, who also co-wrote most of the album's songs with Lane and played a majority of the instruments, Sex O'Clock received a positive reception from critics upon release.

== Reception ==
Editors at AllMusic chose this as an Album Pick in Lane's discography and rated this album 4.5 out of 5 stars, with critic Stewart Mason writing that "Sex O'Clock mixes sleek, creamy, and often danceable R&B-tinged pop tunes with the sort of lyrical plain-spokenness implied by the title". In Exclaim!'s Rob Bolton characterized this release, "upon first glance, this looks to be a potentially cheeky mainstream album, but Sex O'Clock is actually a respectably good package of slick, sultry pop". Writing for Louder Than War on the occasion of the album's 20th anniversary re-release, Mark Ray praised several tracks for showing the influences of genres as diverse as funk and jazz, summing up that Lane's "artistic merits can’t be summed up in one album, but the wisdom and smarts she brings to an album about sex and relationships is heads above anything most artists offer" and rating this work an 8 out of 10.

Helen Wright of musicOMH noted that while all the songs are thematically about sex, "some are smooth and sensual others chill the heart" with lyrics that are occasionally "pretty bleak, or at best bitter-sweet" as well as those which are "a bit silly, but fun all the same". A review at PopMatters compares the vocal style on this recording to Vanessa Daou and states that it is distinct and has a "spoken word style [that] brings to mind sophisticated urban couples having a martinis at a dinner party where architecture is discussed at length and even after lethal aperitifs". A retrospective on Lane's life by Eleanor Philpot of The Quietus stated that this discussion of women's sexuality and desire was "a signpost along the road to normalising such a representation of female identity" and has "power to encourage an open and honest conversation around the complex nature of female sexuality". In Under the Radar, Joe W. Ragusa scored this work a 7 out of 10 for being "a provocative, if less than brilliant pop piece that could shake up a few Britney teenyboppers from their stupor if it ever reached their ears".

== Track listing ==
No.	Title	Writer(s)	Length
1.	"Home Is Where the Hatred Is"	Gil Scott-Heron	3:22
2.	"The Next Man That I See"	Mick Harvey, Anita Lane, James Sclavunos, Thomas Wydler	5:46
3.	"Do That Thing"	Harvey, Lane	4:46
4.	"I Hate Myself"	Harvey, Lane	4:54
5.	"Light Possession"	Harvey, Lane	4:59
6.	"I Love You, I Am No More"	Harvey, Lane	3:24
7.	"Like Caesar Needs a Brutus"	Simon Bonney, Harvey, Wydler	4:36
8.	"Do the Kamasutra"	Harvey, Lane	3:56
9.	"The Petrol Wife"	Lane, Tom Tykwer	3:44
10.	"Bella ciao"	Traditional	5:08
Total length:			44:31

== Personnel ==
- Anita Lane – vocals
- Mick Harvey – instruments

Additional musicians

- Cyril Garac – violin
- Jayney Klimek – backing vocals
- Thierry Koehl – violin
- Christian Lechevretel – trumpet, horns
- Nick Cave & The Bad Seeds – improvisations on "The Next Man That I See" and "Like Caesar Needs a Brutus"
  - Blixa Bargeld
  - Martyn P. Casey
  - Nick Cave
  - Warren Ellis
  - Mick Harvey
  - Conway Savage
  - Jim Sclavunos
  - Thomas Wydler
- Odile Ollagnon – violin
- Sébastien Surel – violin
- Marylène Vinciguerra – viola
- Thomas Wydler – drums on "Home Is Where the Hatred Is" and "I Hate Myself"

Technical personnel

- Bertrand Burgalat – string arranged, strings and vocals recording
- Ross Cockle – mastering at Sing Sing Studios (Richmond, Australia)
- Joe Dillworth – photography
- Flood – drum recording on "Home Is Where the Hatred Is" and "I Hate Myself"
- Mick Harvey – instrumentation, production
- Michael Hepworth – editing
- Tim Johnston – loops recording on "Like Caesar Needs a Brutus"
- Andrea Libonati – artwork
- David McCluney – recording, mixing at Atlantis Studios (Melbourne, Australia) in June 2000 and January 2001
- Kevin Paul – vocals recording, overdubbing

== See also ==
- List of 2001 albums
