= Intoxicated Women =

Studio album by Mick Harvey
- Released: January 20, 2017
- Studios: Birdland Studios, Prahran, Victoria; Candy Bomber Studio, Berlin; Studio CBE, Paris; Grace Lane, Atlantis Studios and Tender Trap Studios, Melbourne
- Length: 46:50
- Label: Mute
- Producer: Mick Harvey

Mick Harvey chronology
Delirium Tremens (2016)	Intoxicated Women (2017)	The Fall and Rise of Edgar Bourchier and the Horrors of War (2018)

Professional ratings
Aggregate scores
Source	Rating
AnyDecentMusic?	7/10
Metacritic	79/100
Review scores
Source	Rating
Blurt Magazine	5/5 stars
AllMusic	4/5 stars
Clash	8/10

Intoxicated Women is the eight studio album by Australian musician Mick Harvey, released on 20 January 2017 through Mute Records. The album is Harvey's fourth in his series of Serge Gainsbourg interpretations/translations, and preceded by Intoxicated Man in 1995, Pink Elephants in 1997 and Delirium Tremens in 2016.

== Track listing ==
All tracks are written by Serge Gainsbourg; except where noted. Translations by Mick Harvey with Lyndelle-Jayne Spruyt.

No.	Title	Writer(s)	Length
1.	"Ich Liebe Dich...Ich Dich Auch Nicht (Je t'aime... moi non plus)"		5:14
2.	"All Day Suckers (Les sucettes)"		2:38
3.	"Contact"		2:40
4.	"Prévert’s Song (Chanson de Prévert)"		2:48
5.	"The Eyes to Cry (Les Yeux Pour Pleurer)"		3:03
6.	"Puppet of Wax, Puppet of Song (Poupée de cire, poupée de son)"		2:29
7.	"Baby Teeth, Wolfy Teeth (Dents de Lait, Dents de Loup)"		1:24
8.	"God Smokes Havanas (Dieu Est un Fumeur de Havanes)"		3:25
9.	"While Rereading Your Letter (En Relisant Ta Lettre)"		2:21
10.	"Sensuelle et Sans Suite"		2:46
11.	"The Homely Ones (Les Petits Boudins)"		2:10
12.	"Lost Loves (Les Amours Perdues)"		2:49
13.	"Striptease"	Gainsbourg, Alain Goraguer	3:27
14.	"The Drowned One (La Noyée)"		2:46
15.	"Cargo Cult (Cargo Culte)"		6:50
Total length:			46:50

== Personnel ==
- Mick Harvey – vocals, guitar, piano, organ, drums, bongos, cabasa
- Andrea Schroeder – vocals on "Ich Liebe Dich...Ich Dich Auch Nicht", "God Smokes Havanas" and "Striptease"
- Srey Kak Chanthy – vocals on "Contact"
- Xanthe Waite – vocals on "Contact" and "Puppet of Wax, Puppet of Song", backing vocals on "Baby Teeth, Wolfy Teeth"
- Jessica Ribeiro – vocals on "Prévert's Song" and "The Drowned One"
- Sophia Brous – vocals on "The Eyes to Cry" and "While Rereading Your Letter"
- Solomon Harvey – vocals on "Baby Teeth, Wolfy Teeth"
- Julitha Ryan, Mick Harvey, Xanthe Waite – choir on "Cargo Cult"
- Lyndelle-Jayne Spruyt – vocals on "Sensuelle et Sans Suite"
- J.P. Shilo – guitar, slide guitar, vocals
- Bertrand Burgalat, Glenn Lewis – bass
- Toby Dammit, Hugo Cran – drums
- Steve Shelley – hi-hat, tambourine
- Yoyo Röhm – organ, piano, e-bow
- Brenton Conlan – trumpet on "Baby Teeth, Wolfy Teeth"
- Anouk Ross, Biddy Connor, Bronwyn Henderson, Dahlia Adamopoulos, Lizzy Walsh, Pauline Hauswirth, Vincent Catulescu – strings

Technical

- Brenton Conlan, David Mestre, Ingo Krauss – engineer
- Lindsay Gravina – mixing

== Charts ==
Chart	Peak position
Belgian Albums (Ultratop Wallonia)	163
