= Barry Adamson =

English musician (born 1958)

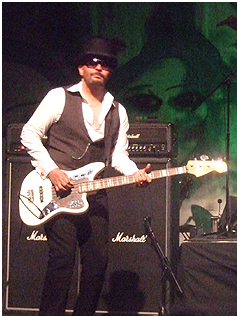
- Adamson performing with Magazine in 2009

Background information
- Born: 11 June 1958 (age 68); Moss Side, Manchester, England
- Genres: Alternative rock; post-punk; electronica; post-rock; acid jazz; soul jazz; lounge
- Occupation: Musician
- Instruments: Bass; vocals; guitar; keyboards; drums
- Years active: 1977–present
- Formerly of: Magazine; Buzzcocks; Visage; Nick Cave and the Bad Seeds
- Website: barryadamson.com

Barry Adamson (born 11 June 1958) is an English rock musician. He came to prominence in the late 1970s as a member of the post-punk band Magazine and went on to work with Visage, Nick Cave and the Bad Seeds, and the electro musicians Pan Sonic. In addition to prolific solo work, Adamson has also remixed Grinderman, The Jon Spencer Blues Explosion, Recoil and Depeche Mode. He also worked on the soundtrack for David Lynch's surrealistic crime film Lost Highway.

== Biography ==
=== Early life ===
Adamson was born in Moss Side, Manchester, England to a white mother and a black father. He read comic books from an early age. At school he immersed himself in art, music and film and produced his first song – "Brain Pain" – at the age of 10. His diverse musical tastes range from Alice Cooper to Motown to David Bowie.

=== Career ===
After leaving school, Adamson drifted into graphic design whilst attending Stockport Art College but quit shortly after, preferring to venture into the exploding punk rock scene of the late 1970s. He joined ex-Buzzcocks singer Howard Devoto's band Magazine to play the bass guitar, with whom he scored one chart single, "Shot by Both Sides"; in late 1977, he joined the Buzzcocks, as a temporary replacement for Garth Smith. He played on all of Magazine's albums in their original incarnation and contributed to Devoto's solo album and his next band, Luxuria. He also contributed to the studio-based band Visage, playing on the ensemble's first two albums, Visage and The Anvil.

After Magazine broke up, Adamson worked with another ex-Buzzcock, Pete Shelley, before joining Nick Cave and the Bad Seeds, featuring on four of their albums: From Her to Eternity, The Firstborn Is Dead, Kicking Against the Pricks and Your Funeral, My Trial. After his stint with the band and a European tour with Iggy Pop in 1987, he went solo, releasing an EP, The Man with the Golden Arm in 1988, and his first solo album, Moss Side Story, the following year, the "soundtrack" to a non-existent film noir. The album incorporated newscasts and sampled sound effects and featured guest musicians Marcia Schofield (of The Fall), Diamanda Galas, and former colleagues from the Bad Seeds. Adamson's second solo album was the soundtrack to a real film this time – Carl Colpaert's Delusion, and he would go on to provide soundtracks for several other films.

Adamson's third album, Soul Murder, was shortlisted for the Mercury Music Prize in 1992.

His solo work has mostly been influenced by John Barry, Elmer Bernstein and Ennio Morricone, whilst his later works include jazz, electronica, soul, funk, and dub-styles.

In 1996, Adamson contributed to the AIDS-Benefit Album, Offbeat: A Red Hot Soundtrip, produced by the Red Hot Organization. His own album that year, Oedipus Schmoedipus, reached No. 51 in the UK Albums Chart. It would later be included in the 1001 Albums You Must Hear Before You Die list, along with Moss Side Story.

In 2002, Adamson left his long-term label, Mute Records, and started his own production home, Central Control International. In 2006, he released Stranger on the Sofa, first for his Central Control International imprint, to critical acclaim. Back to the Cat, his second album for the label, was released in March 2008.

In 2007, it was announced that Magazine would re-form for concerts in 2008. Adamson took part in the same band line-up that recorded Secondhand Daylight, with the exception of the late John McGeoch, who was replaced by Noko. However, Adamson latter withdrew from the reunion and new recordings.

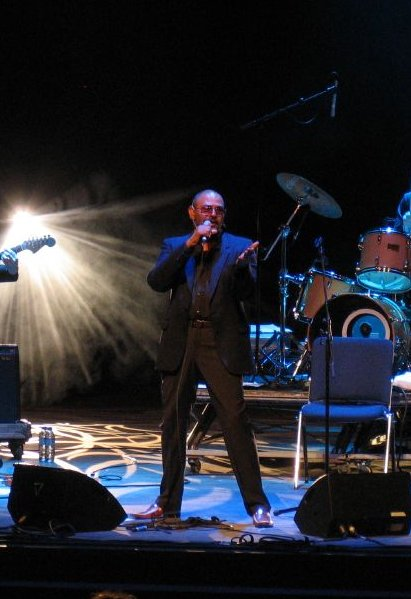
Adamson in 2007

On 27 August 2010, Adamson released the track "Rag and Bone", as a digital download and as a 12-inch vinyl record.

In 2011, Adamson premiered his directorial debut, Therapist, for which he also provided the music. He then released a studio album, I Will Set You Free, on 30 January 2012.

Adamson collaborated with the Bad Seeds on their 2013 album, Push the Sky Away, playing bass guitar on two songs. He also toured with the band on drums and keyboards, to fill in for an ailing Thomas Wydler.

His 2016 album Know Where To Run was accompanied by a book with photos that Adamson shot in the US while on tour with Nick Cave. 2018 saw the release of Memento Mori, an album celebrating his 40th anniversary as a professional musician, which was followed by a concert at the Union Chapel in London. A recording of this concert was released on vinyl and CD.

==== Soundtrack material ====
Adamson's "Refugee Song" was included in Derek Jarman's The Last of England soundtrack. He composed the soundtrack to Delusion, which has also been released. Adamson also contributed soundtrack material to Gas Food Lodging and David Lynch's Lost Highway.

== Instruments ==
In the earliest Real Life Magazine videos, Adamson played a Rickenbacker 4001, and on Secondhand Daylight, a Gibson EB-3. His primary bass during Magazine's touring was an Ovation Magnum Mk1. The Ovation can be seen in Magazine's appearance in Urgh! A Music War as well as on the cover of the live album Play. For the 2008 Magazine concerts, he alternated between the Ovation, a Fender Artist and a Fender Jaguar Bass. He often used a Boss Chorus unit on his basses, giving a slightly processed sound that was much imitated in the UK 1980s rock scene.

== Legacy ==
In his autobiography, It's So Easy (And Other Lies), Duff McKagan of Guns N' Roses said he was influenced by bass-driven bands such as that of Barry Adamson in Magazine. In an interview with German music magazine Gitarre & Bass, Billy Gould of Faith No More said that Adamson was one of his influences, because he combined soul music with post-punk when he played with Magazine.

== Discography ==
=== Studio albums ===
Year	Title
1989	Moss Side Story
1992	Soul Murder
1996	Oedipus Schmoedipus
1998	As Above So Below
2002	The King of Nothing Hill
2006	Stranger on the Sofa
2008	Back to the Cat
2012	I Will Set You Free
2016	Know Where to Run
2024	Cut to Black

=== EPs ===
Year	Title
1989	Taming of the Shrewd
1993	The Negro Inside Me
2017	Love Sick Dick
2021	Steal Away

=== Singles ===
Year	Title	Album
1988	"The Man with the Golden Arm"	Moss Side Story
1991	"These Boots Are Made for Walking" (with Anita Lane)	Delusion
1996	Set The Controls For The Heart Of The Pelvis	Oedipus Schmoedipus
1998	"What It Means"	As Above So Below
1998	"Can't Get Loose" b/w non-album tracks "Trouble Asunder (Oedipus Returns)", "Hear the Angels", "Namaste MPC (End Title)"	As Above So Below
1999	"The Crime Scene"	split single with The Jon Spencer Blues Explosion
2001	"Motorlab #3" (with Pan Sonic)	N/A
2002	"Black Amour"	The King of Nothing Hill
2002	"Whispering Streets"	The King of Nothing Hill
2006	"The Long Way Back Again"	Stranger on the Sofa
2008	"Straight 'til Sunrise" (download only)	Back to the Cat
2010	"Rag and Bone"	N/A
2016	"Up in the Air"	Know Where to Run

=== Other appearances ===
Year	Title	Album
1996	"Hip No Therapy"	Offbeat: A Red Hot Soundtrip
2012	"I Wanna Be You"	The Journey Is Long: The Jeffrey Lee Pierce Sessions Project
2019	"4'33"	STUMM433

=== Soundtracks ===
==== Albums ====
Year	Title
1991	Delusion
2011	Dreams of a Life
2023	Scala!!!

==== Contributions ====
Year	Film	Track(s)
1987	The Last of England	"Refugee Theme (15 Rounds)" with Martin McCarrick
1992	Gas Food Lodging	6 tracks
1997	Lost Highway	3 tracks

=== Compilations and samplers ===
Year	Title	Type
1992	Cinema Is King	EP
1995	Movieology	EP
1995	The Big Bamboozle	EP
1999	The Murky World of Barry Adamson	Album
2018	Memento Mori	Album

=== Compositions ===
- To Have and to Hold (1996) film score with Nick Cave & Mick Harvey
- The World of Interiors (2001) film score
