= Anita Lane =

Australian singer-songwriter (1960–2021)

Background information
- Born: Anita Louise Lane; 18 March 1960; Melbourne, Victoria, Australia
- Died: 27 April 2021 (aged 61)
- Genres: Post-punk; alternative rock
- Occupations: Singer; songwriter; musician
- Instruments: Vocals; keyboards
- Years active: 1979–2021
- Label: Mute
- Formerly of: Nick Cave and the Bad Seeds

Anita Louise Lane (18 March 1960 – 27 April 2021) was an Australian singer-songwriter who was briefly a member of the Bad Seeds with Nick Cave and Mick Harvey and collaborated with both bandmates. Lane released two solo albums, Dirty Pearl (1993) and Sex O'Clock (2001).

== Early life ==
Anita Louise Lane was born in Melbourne in 1960. She began singing and writing songs at the age of 16. She was a classmate of Rowland S. Howard while both were students at the Prahran College of Advanced Education, undertaking the Tertiary Orientation Programme.

== Music career ==
=== 1979–1983 : The Birthday Party ===
Lane met Nick Cave in 1977 and the pair began an intermittent personal relationship. Cave, on lead vocals, was a member of a new wave group the Boys Next Door with Mick Harvey on guitar, Phill Calvert on drums and Tracy Pew on bass guitar. By December 1978, Rowland S. Howard had joined the line up on lead guitar. In February 1980, the Boys Next Door were renamed as the Birthday Party and Lane and Cave moved to London with the group.

Lane and Cave co-wrote the lyrics for "A Dead Song", which appeared on their debut album Prayers on Fire which was released in April 1981. AllMusic's Greg Maurer praised the album and noted Lane's song writing contribution. George Starostin of Only Solitaire felt that, on this track, Cave "sounds, with all of his whiny 'okay okay', just like one of those poor innocent or half-innocent victims with a bloody nose and a gun at their temple in a gangster movie".

For their second album, Junkyard, which was released in May 1982, Lane and Cave co-wrote "Dead Joe" and "Kiss Me Black". Session and touring musician Barry Adamson provided bass guitar on "Kiss Me Black". The group relocated to West Berlin in August 1982 prior to their cessation in June of the following year.

=== 1984–2001: Collaborations and solo career ===
Lane was briefly a member of Nick Cave and the Bad Seeds playing piano, along with singing backing and occasional lead vocals. She was a member alongside Cave, Harvey, Adamson, Blixa Bargeld and Hugo Race. She supplied lyrics for "From Her to Eternity", the title track of their debut album (June 1984). She left the group soon after.

Lane co-wrote "Stranger Than Kindness" with Bargeld, which appears on Nick Cave and the Bad Seeds' fourth album, Your Funeral... My Trial which was released in November 1986. Chris Long of BBC Music reviewed the album in May 2009 and found that "Stranger Than Kindness" was a "twisted love song. At once both beautiful and startling, it is a song that sounds like a held breath, never letting slip the power that swells within it".

Lane added her lead vocals over a musical score by Bargeld, Cave and Harvey for the soundtrack of the 1988 Australian film Ghosts... of the Civil Dead, including the track "A Prison in the Desert". Jon Behm of Reviler.org praised her "ethereal howling/whispering vocals, which due to her babydoll voice sound a bit like the ravings of a mentally disturbed child. It's a pretty intriguing tune for any fan of moody, somewhat frightening music".

Lane had a "sporadic solo career" beginning with her four-track extended play Dirty Sings in 1988 on Mute Records. For the recording, she was joined by Adamson, Cave, Harvey and Thomas Wydler on drums (of Nick Cave and the Bad Seeds, ex-Die Haut); while Harvey produced the EP.

She also provided guest vocals on "The Bells Belong to the Ashes" for the album Headless Body in Topless Bar in 1988 by German post-punk post-rock band Die Haut.

In 1989, Lane was featured on Adamson's debut solo album, Moss Side Story; with Harvey, she was part of the Freedom Choir on "Suck on the Honey of Love" and "Free at Last". She supplied vocals again for his second solo effort, the soundtrack for the film Delusion (1991).

In 1992, she performed a duet with Kid Congo Powers on Die Haut's track "Excited" and another with Bargeld on "How Long (Have We Known Each Other Now)" for the German group's album Head On. Lane and Bargeld duetted again on "Blume" for his group, Einstürzende Neubauten's sixth studio album, Tabula Rasa (1993). The track is co-written by Lane, Bargeld and his group members.

In 1993, Lane issued her debut solo studio album Dirty Pearl, recorded from 1982 to that year. It consists of her work with The Birthday Party, Nick Cave and the Bad Seeds, Einstürzende Neubauten and Die Haut, as well as exclusive album tracks. The album was co-produced by Bargeld, Cave, Harvey, Johannes Beck, John Cafferty, Die Haut, Einstürzende Neubaten, Sven Röhrig, and The Birthday Party. An expanded CD version includes all four Dirty Sings tracks. Ned Raggett of AllMusic noted that Dirty Pearl was a "collection organized in reverse chronological order", which was "a bit fragmented as a result [it] still makes for an involving listen, demonstrating clearly that her work is worth taking on its own terms instead of simply being a Cave footnote". He praised her singing "a good if at points girlish voice, albeit one that she's shown more control over with time ... she has a taste for smoky sonic settings for her vocals, sometimes low-key and sly, other times frenetic even as she keeps her cool". Consumable Online's Reto Koradi felt the music "glooms in the dark, slow and almost hypnotic. The lyrics paint pictures of dreams, love, sex, religion and death". Most of the original tracks were co-written by Lane with Harvey. The album provided Lane's single "The World's a Girl", which appeared on 5 June 1995. Koradi declared that it was "an obvious choice as a single, it's the most radio-friendly track". The lead track was co-written with Harvey. The two B-sides were duets with Cave for cover versions of "Bedazzled" – originally by Peter Cook and Dudley Moore for their 1967 film of the same name; and "I Love You... Nor Do I" – originally by Gainsbourg and Brigitte Bardot in French as "Je t'aime... moi non plus" (recorded in 1967).

In 1995, Lane contributed vocals to Harvey's Serge Gainsbourg tribute album Intoxicated Man. She returned in 1997 for his second Gainsbourg-inspired album Pink Elephants. Over the two albums, Harvey had Lane "singing the female parts originally performed by the likes of Jane Birkin, Brigitte Bardot and Anna Karina".

For Murder Ballads, released in February 1996, the ninth studio album by Nick Cave and the Bad Seeds, Lane sang a verse of their cover version of Bob Dylan's "Death Is Not the End" and vocals for "The Kindness of Strangers".

Lane's second solo studio album Sex O' Clock was released on 23 October 2001, produced by Harvey. AllMusic's Stewart Mason found it "mixes sleek, creamy, and often danceable R&B-tinged pop tunes with the sort of lyrical plain-spokenness implied by the title". He could not decide whether her delivery which is "so deadpan that it's hard to tell if the sexually-obsessed (and to be honest, rather trite) lyrics ... are meant as parodies of Tori Amos and/or Alanis Morissette, or if Lane takes ... [her lines] seriously".

Sex O'Clock includes a cover version of Gil Scott-Heron's song "Home Is Where the Hatred Is", which Mason lists as one of its "best tracks". Another of Mason's favourites is "I Hate Myself", co-written by Doc Pomus and Ken Hirsch. Lane and Adamson duet on a cover version of Lee Hazlewood's "These Boots Were Made for Walking". In May 2008, Guy Blackman of The Age felt the album was under-appreciated, it was "a classic of suggestive orchestral pop. It should have set the world alight, but didn't".

Anita Lane's vocals, sourced from a telephone recording, are sampled by Nick Cave and the Bad Seeds in the 2024 Wild God track "O Wow O Wow (How Wonderful She Is)".

== Cover versions ==
Digital hardcore band Lolita Storm covered "Stranger Than Kindness" for the tribute album Eyes for an Eye: A Tribute to Nick Cave in 1996. Swedish singer Karin Dreijer (under their pseudonym, Fever Ray) also covered it in November 2009, which was accompanied by a music video. It was issued as a single in support of Dreijer's self-titled debut album. "A Dead Song" was performed by US artists, Get Hustle, for a tribute album, Release the Bats – The Birthday Party as Heard Through the Grinder of Three One G (2006). Australian singer-songwriter Tim Rogers tackled "From Her to Eternity" on Straight to You – Triple J's Tribute to Nick Cave in February 2012.

== Personal life ==
From 1977, Lane and Nick Cave had a personal and professional relationship; they separated as a couple in 1983 but intermittently worked together professionally into the 1990s. In 1984, Lane formed a personal relationship with Australian journalist and writer Nicolas Rothwell. They lived together for a short time in New York where Rothwell was then working. In the mid-1980s, she lived back in Sydney, Australia, in a relationship with Andrew Foote before returning to Berlin, where she had spent some time with Cave in the early 1980s, and resumed her relationship with Cave. It would, however, be short lived.

After the relationship with Cave ended, Lane stayed on in Berlin. By the early 1990s, she had married German man Johannes Beck, with whom she had her first child in 1990. After the breakdown of the marriage, she lived in Essaouira, Morocco in 1994/95 where she commenced a relationship with Sicilian man Andrea Libonati. This resulted in two more sons. In 2003, Lane moved back to Australia with Libonati and her children and took up residence in Byron Bay, before moving back to Melbourne in 2008 with her children to her original family home in the suburb of Glen Iris. From early 2020, Lane had moved by herself into a house in Melbourne's inner suburb of Collingwood where she lived until her death.

On 27 April 2021, Lane died at age 61. No cause of death was given. She was less active in her career in the final years of her life primarily due to health issues.

== Discography ==
=== Albums ===
List of albums, with selected details
Title	Album details
Dirty Pearl	Released: October 1993; Label: Mute (CDSTUMM 81); Format: CD, LP Cassette
Intoxicated Man (Mick Harvey featuring Anita Lane)	Released: 1995; Label: Mute (CDSTUMM144); Format: CD, Cassette
Sex O'Clock	Released: September 2001; Label: Mute (CDSTUMM183); Format: CD

=== EPs ===
List of EP, with selected details
Title	EP details
Dirty Sings	Released: May 1988; Label: Mute (12MUTE65); Format: CD
Yadi Yadi (As Gudrun Gut and Anita Lane)	Released: 1995; Label: Alternation (INT 125.424); Format: CD

=== Other appearances ===
Year	Title	Artist	Contributions
1981	Prayers on Fire: "A Dead Song"	The Birthday Party	co-writing lyrics
1982	Junkyard: "Dead Joe", "Kiss Me Black"	The Birthday Party	co-writing lyrics
1984	From Her to Eternity: "From Her to Eternity"	Nick Cave and the Bad Seeds	co-writing lyrics
1986	Your Funeral, My Trial: "Stranger Than Kindness"	Nick Cave and the Bad Seeds	co-writing lyrics
1988	Headless Body in a Topless Bar: "The Bells Belong to the Ashes"	Die Haut	guest lead vocalist
1989	Ghosts... of the Civil Dead: "A Prison in the Desert", "Lilly's Theme (A Touch of Warmth)"	Soundtrack by Blixa Bargeld, Nick Cave, Mick Harvey	guest lead vocalist
1989	Moss Side Story: "Suck on the Honey of Love", "Free at Last"	Barry Adamson	guest backing vocalist
1992	Head On: "Excited", "How Long (Have We Known Each Other Now)"	Die Haut	guest lead vocalist (duets)
1993	Tabula Rasa: "Blume", "Wüste"	Einstürzende Neubauten	co-writing lyrics (for "Blume" only), guest lead vocalist (both tracks)
1995	Intoxicated Man: "69 Erotic Year", "Harley Davidson", "Ford Mustang", "Overseas Telegram", "Bonnie and Clyde", "Song of Slurs"	Mick Harvey	guest lead vocalist (duets)
1995	"Initials B.B." (7" & CDs)	Mick Harvey	guest lead vocalist (duet)
1996	Members of the Ocean Club: "Yadiyadi", "Firething"	Gudrun Gut	guest lead vocalist (duets)
1996	Murder Ballads: "The Kindness of Strangers", "Death Is not the End"	Nick Cave and the Bad Seeds	guest lead vocalist
1997	Pink Elephants: "I Love You ... Nor Do I" ("Je t'aime... moi non plus")	Mick Harvey	guest vocalist
2000	Objectif Pub: "I Got You (I Feel Good)"	various artists compilation	lead vocalist
2000	Der Krieger und die Kaiserin: "Four Days"	Soundtrack by Pale 3	co-writing lyrics, guest lead vocalist
