= Mick Harvey =

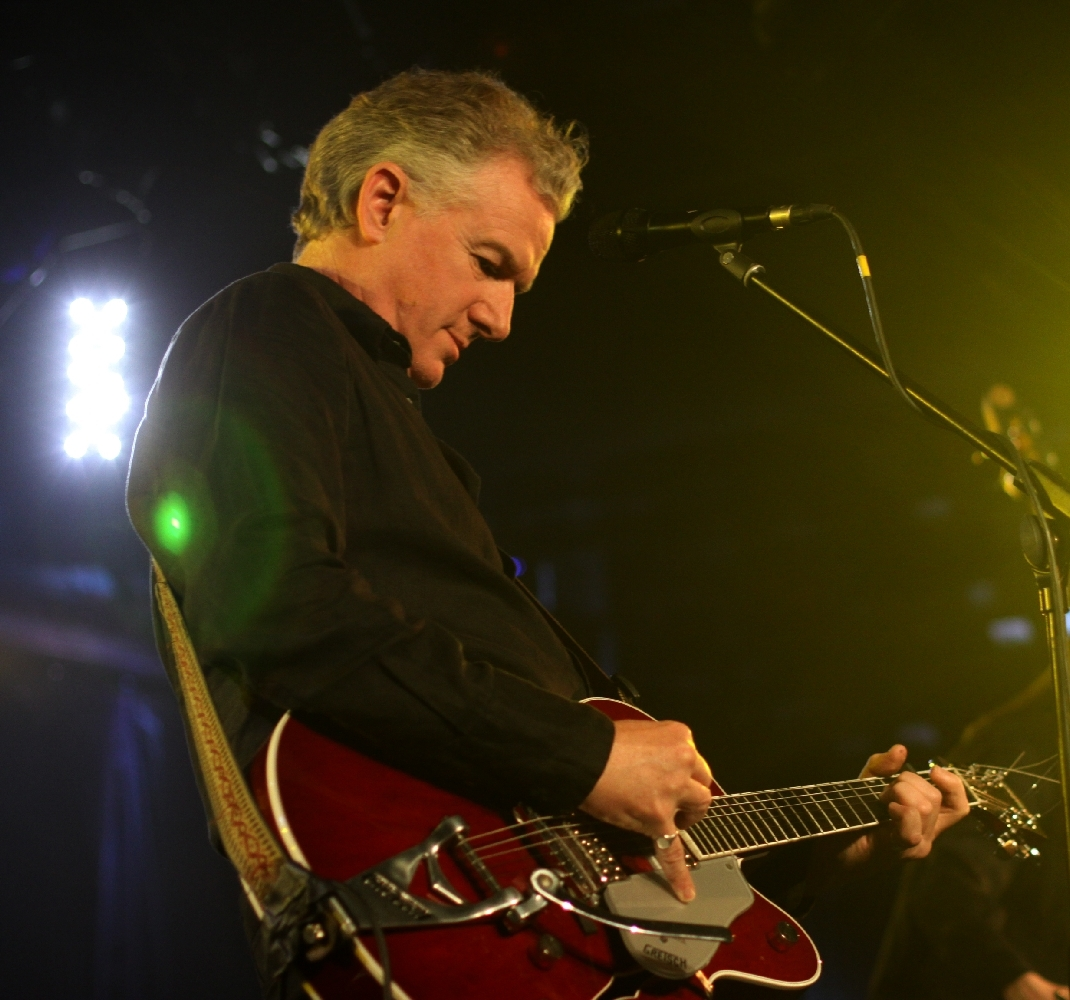
- Mick Harvey performing live in 2012

Background information
- Born: Michael John Harvey; 29 August 1958 (age 68); Rochester, Victoria, Australia
- Origin: Melbourne, Victoria, Australia
- Genres: Alternative rock; post-punk
- Occupations: Musician; singer-songwriter; multi-instrumentalist; record producer; composer; arranger
- Instruments: Vocals; guitar; bass; keyboards; harmonica; drums; percussion; turntables; sampler
- Years active: 1973–present
- Label: Mute
- Formerly of: Nick Cave and the Bad Seeds; The Birthday Party
- Website: mickharvey.com

Michael John Harvey (born 29 August 1958) is an Australian musician, singer-songwriter, composer, arranger and record producer. A multi-instrumentalist, he is best known for his long-term collaborations with Nick Cave, with whom he formed the Boys Next Door, the Birthday Party and Nick Cave and the Bad Seeds. Harvey has also produced and contributed to multiple recordings by different artists and released several albums and soundtracks as a solo artist.

== Early life ==
Born in Rochester, Victoria, Australia, Harvey moved to the suburbs of Melbourne in his childhood. His father was a Church of England vicar, and the family lived adjacent to the father's church; first in Ormond and later in Ashburton. Harvey sang in the church choir from an early age.

Harvey, his elder brother Philip, and younger brother Sebastian all attended the private boys' school Caulfield Grammar School. He met Nick Cave, Phill Calvert and Tracy Pew at school in the early 1970s. A rock group was formed with Cave (vocals), Harvey (guitar), Calvert (drums), and other students on guitar, bass and saxophone. The band played at parties and school functions, with a repertoire of Lou Reed, David Bowie, Roxy Music, Alice Cooper and the Sensational Alex Harvey Band, among others. Harvey was also a member of the school choir, conducted by actor Norman Kaye, and took extracurricular lessons from jazz guitarist Bruce Clarke.

== Music career ==
=== The Birthday Party ===
After their final school year in 1975, Harvey, Nick Cave and Phill Calvert's band decided to continue with Tracy Pew as bassist. Greatly influenced by the punk explosion of 1976, which saw Australian bands The Saints and Radio Birdman make their first recordings and tours, The Boys Next Door, as the band was now called, began performing fast, original new wave material. Harvey's guitar style was influenced by James Williamson of The Stooges and Paul Weller of The Jam. The Boys Next Door regularly played at Melbourne pubs between 1977 and 1980. Rowland S. Howard joined the band in 1978, bringing with him a chaotic feedback guitar style.

After extensive touring, recordings, and moderate success in Australia, the Boys Next Door relocated to London, England in 1980, and changed their name to The Birthday Party. Harvey's girlfriend Katy Beale followed the band to London. This period was defined by innovative and aggressive music composition, underpinned by Harvey's guitar playing. The band moved to West Berlin, Germany in 1982, but without Calvert; Harvey subsequently transitioned from guitar to drums.

=== Crime and the City Solution ===
After the breakup of The Birthday Party and while initiating the early recordings of what would become the Bad Seeds with Nick Cave, Harvey contacted his friend Simon Bonney, with whom he reformed Bonney's old Australian band Crime & the City Solution. Rowland S. Howard, Harry Howard (bass) and Epic Soundtracks (drums), all of whom a few years later would form the basis of These Immortal Souls, also participated. This line-up of the band found its peak and demise with its appearance in the Wim Wenders film Wings of Desire. Bonney then stayed in Berlin and formed the next line-up of the band with his partner Bronwyn Adams, Harvey (drums), Alexander Hacke of Einstürzende Neubauten (guitar), Chrislo Haas of Liaisons Dangereuses and D.A.F. (synthesizer), and Thomas Stern (bass). The line-up released three studio albums and toured until 1991.

=== Nick Cave and The Bad Seeds ===
Harvey and Cave formed Nick Cave and the Bad Seeds in 1983. Harvey was principally the drummer on the band's first two albums before Thomas Wydler became a full-time member. After the departure of Barry Adamson, Harvey was primarily a bass guitarist for several years until the arrival of Martyn P. Casey in 1990 when Harvey moved back to guitar, his original instrument. In all versions of the band, Harvey also played keyboards, xylophone and other instruments as needed, and sang backing vocals.

Throughout the 1980s and 1990s, Harvey was usually charged with the production of the recordings along with Cave and guitarist Blixa Bargeld, in addition to co-writing many of the band's songs and putting together most of the string arrangements and other orchestration. He was often perceived as a musical director for the band and also managed much of the band's business affairs right up until his departure. Harvey remained with the Bad Seeds for 25 years until his last show in Perth, Australia on 20 January 2009, when he cited both professional and personal factors as reasons for leaving. Regarding Cave, Harvey informed the media:

I'm confident Nick [Cave] will continue to be a creative force and that this is the right time to pass on my artistic and managerial role to what has become a tremendous group of people who can support him in his endeavours, both musically and organisationally.

In 2010, Harvey explained further how his frustration with song arrangements strained his relationship with Cave. A desire to spend time with family was also a significant reason for his decision to leave the Bad Seeds. The split marked the end of a 36-year-long collaboration between Harvey and Cave.

=== Anita Lane ===
Harvey worked extensively with Anita Lane, Nick Cave's muse and partner of many years, on the albums Dirty Pearl (1993) and Sex O'Clock (2001).

=== The Wallbangers ===
In 2007, the Spanish label Bang! Records released a four-track EP by Harvey's retro rock band The Wallbangers, called Kick the Drugs featuring songs written by Harvey and songs he co-wrote with Tex Perkins and Loene Carmen. Harvey sang and played guitar on the recordings.

=== Solo ===
After Bonney left Crime & the City Solution for a solo career in the early 1990s, Harvey recorded two solo albums of Serge Gainsbourg songs, translated from French into English: Intoxicated Man (1995) and Pink Elephants (1997). He also collaborated with UK rock musician PJ Harvey (no relation), and produced recordings for other Australian artists, including Anita Lane, Robert Forster, Conway Savage and Rowland S. Howard. Harvey's third solo album, One Man's Treasure, was released in September 2005.

Harvey undertook his first solo tours of Europe and Australia in 2006, accompanied by fellow Bad Seeds Thomas Wydler and James Johnston, as well as Melbourne-based double bassist Rosie Westbrook. His next solo record, 2007's Two of Diamonds, was recorded with this group, as was the 2008 live album Three Sisters – Live at Bush Hall.

In February 2008, Harvey and Westbrook played as a support act for PJ Harvey on her Australian tour, with both Harveys also performing on stage together. Prior to the tour, Harvey had worked extensively with PJ Harvey over a 12-year period: he was a recording musician on her albums To Bring You My Love and Is This Desire?, and co-produced the album Stories from the City, Stories from the Sea in 2000.

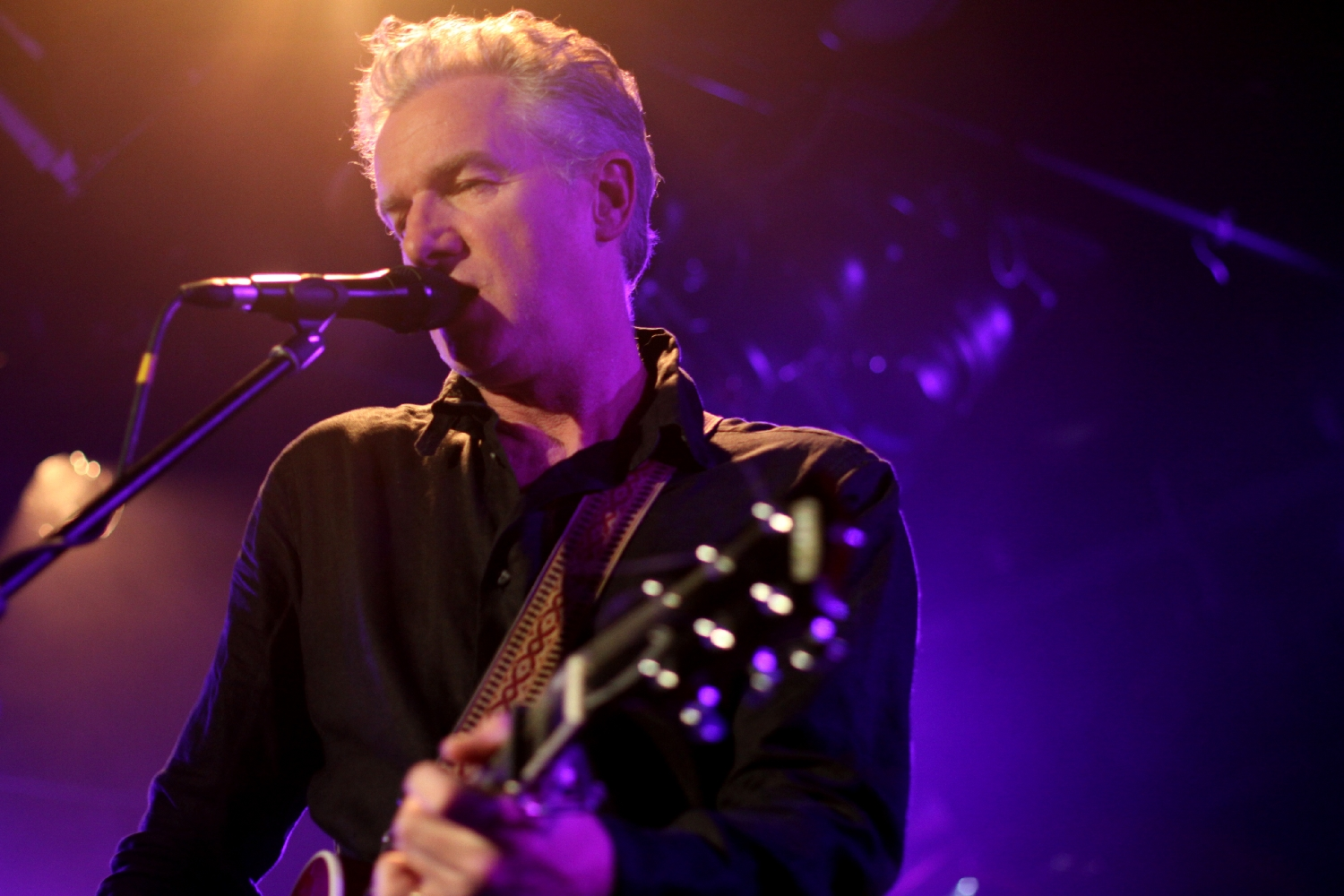
Harvey performing in 2012

In both 2008 and 2009, he joined the five remaining members of The Triffids for a series of performances at the Sydney Festival, Arts Centre Melbourne and Perth International Arts Festival, celebrating the music and the memory of David McComb. Harvey is also a contributor to the 2009 edited collection, Vagabond Holes: David McComb and the Triffids, edited by Australian academics Niall Lucy and Chris Coughran.

During 2008 and 2009, Harvey worked on what would be Rowland S. Howard's last album Pop Crimes, playing drums while future collaborator J.P. Shilo provided bass and violin. The album was released just a few months before Howard succumbed to liver cancer in late 2009.

Harvey released Sketches from the Book of the Dead—the first solo album written entirely by himself—in early 2011. The 11-track album was recorded in Melbourne, between a Port Melbourne studio and his own Grace Lane music room. Harvey played most of the instruments, while Westbrook played double bass, Shilo played accordion, violin and occasional guitar, and Xanthe Waite contributed backing vocals. Harvey explained in a promotional interview that he does not perceive himself as a "songwriter" in the traditional sense, whereby the practice is: "something they [actual songwriters, as perceived by Harvey] have done historically and something they've worked on as central to what they are as an artist". He also confirmed that the opening track, "October Boy", is about Rowland S. Howard.

Harvey again co-produced and recorded for PJ Harvey during the creation of her eighth studio album, Let England Shake. The 2011 release was supported by a world tour in the same year, which also included Harvey as a touring musician.

Harvey's sixth solo studio album, Four (Acts of Love), was released on Mute in 2013 and included original compositions by Harvey alongside a song by PJ Harvey ("Glorious") and interpretations of The Saints' "The Story of Love", Van Morrison's "The Way Young Lovers Do", Exuma's "Summertime in New York" and Roy Orbison's "Wild Hearts (Run Out of Time)". Four (Acts of Love) was recorded at Grace Lane, North Melbourne and Atlantis Sound, Melbourne, and featured regular collaborators Westbrook on double bass and Shilo on guitar and violin.

Harvey again collaborated with PJ Harvey in early 2015, playing and singing on her album The Hope Six Demolition Project. The following year he joined PJ on tour promoting the album, which was released in April 2016.

Harvey's third installment in his project of translating Serge Gainsbourg's songs into English, Delirium Tremens, was released in 2016. The album was recorded in Melbourne with Harvey's Antipodean-based core live band. Ten songs were tracked at Birdland Studios before the project was relocated to Berlin, where a further nine songs were recorded with Toby Dammit (The Stooges, The Residents) and Bertrand Burgalat (of French label Tricatel), who was the string arranger on the first two volumes.

Harvey continued his dedication to the works of Serge Gainsbourg with Intoxicated Women, released in 2017. The album focused on Gainsbourg's duets and songs from the 1960s, which he wrote specifically for renowned singers such as France Gall, Juliette Greco and Brigitte Bardot. To realise the project, Harvey collaborated with a number of guest musicians: Xanthe Waite, German singer Andrea Schroeder, Jess Ribeiro, Sophia Brous, Cambodian singer Kak Channthy, Lyndelle-Jayne Spruyt, and his son Solomon Harvey.

In 2018, Harvey released the album The Fall and Rise of Edgar Bourchier and the Horrors of War in collaboration with author Christopher Richard Barker. He collaborated with Amanda Acevedo for the albums Phantasmagoria in Blue, released in 2023, Golden Mirrors - The Uncovered Sessions Volume 1 (2025), and Psychedelia in White (2026). In May 2024, Harvey released his eleventh studio album, Five Ways to Say Goodbye.

== Personal life ==
Harvey discussing drug use with Andrew McMillen

Harvey divides his time between Europe and Melbourne. He has one son with his partner, Katy Beale, who is a painter. As of 2014, the family resided in the inner-city Melbourne suburb of North Melbourne.

As part of his interview with Brisbane writer Andrew McMillen for the book Talking Smack: Honest Conversations About Drugs, Harvey concluded with his perspective on illicit drug use:

Because I've been so surrounded by [illicit drug use], I've seen a lot of the problems that come with it. But I've also seen a lot of people, as well, who've used in different ways and not had problems. So the point about banning it across the board is that then you remove that freedom of choice of those people, too. I mean, why does alcohol remain available when other things aren't? It's not a great drug, at all.

== Discography ==
=== Studio albums ===
List of studio, with selected details
Title	Details
Intoxicated Man	Released: October 1995; Format: CD, LP, CS; Label: Mute/ Liberation
Pink Elephants	Released: October 1997; Format: CD, LP, CS; Label: Mute/ Liberation
One Man's Treasure	Released: August 2005; Format: CD, LP, CS; Label: Mute
Two of Diamonds	Released: April 2007; Format: CD; Label: Mute
Sketches from the Book of the Dead	Released: 2011; Format: CD; Label: Mute
Four (Acts of Love)	Released: June 2013; Format: CD, digital; Label: Mute
Delirium Tremens	Released: June 2016; Format: CD, LP, digital; Label: Mute
Intoxicated Women	Released: January 2017; Format: CD, LP, digital; Label: Mute
The Fall and Rise of Edgar Bourchier and the Horrors of War (with Christopher Richard Barker)	Released: 2018; Format: CD, LP, digital; Label: Mute
Phantasmagoria in Blue (with Amanda Acevedo)	Released: 2023; Format: CD, LP, digital; Label: Mute
Five Ways to Say Goodbye	Released: May 2024; Format: CD, LP, digital; Label: Mute
Golden Mirrors - The Uncovered Sessions Vol. 1 (with Amanda Acevedo)	Released: March 2025; Format: CD, LP, digital; Label: Mute

=== Soundtracks ===
List of soundtracks, with selected details
Title	Details
Ghosts… of the Civil Dead (with Nick Cave and Blixa Bargeld )	Released: 1989; Format: CD, LP, CS; Label: Mute
Alta Marea & Vaterland	Released: 1993; Format: CD; Label: Mute
To Have and To Hold (with Nick Cave and Blixa Bargeld )	Released: 1996; Format: CD; Label: Mute
And the Ass Saw the Angel (with Nick Cave and Ed Clayton-Jones)	Released: 1998; Format: CD; Label: Mute
Chopper	Released: 2000; Format: CD; Label: Dressed To Kill
Australian Rules	Released: 2003; Format: CD; Label: Virgin
Suburban Mayhem	Released: 2006; Format: CD, digital; Label: Inertia
Waves of Anzac	Released: January 2020; Format: CD, LP, CS; Label: Mute/ Liberation

=== Live albums ===
List of live albums, with selected details
Title	Details
Three Sisters - Live At Bush Hall	Released: 2008; Format: CD, digital; Label: Live Here Now

=== Compilations ===
List of compilations, with selected details
Title	Details
Motion Picture Music '94-'05	Released: 2006; Format: CD; Label: Mute

=== Extended Plays ===
List of EPs, with selected details
Title	Details
The Journey (with With The Letter String Quartet)	Released: 2019; Format: digital; Label: Mute

=== Other appearances ===
- "Just a Little Bit of Rain" for Where Joy Kills Sorrow (1997)
- "I Ate the Knife" for A Tribute to Rowland S Howard (2006)
- "The Snow Country" for We Are Only Riders: The Jeffrey Lee Pierce Sessions Project (2010)
- "Sonny Boy" and "St. Mark's Place" for The Journey Is Long: The Jeffrey Lee Pierce Sessions Project (2012)
- "First Street Blues" for Son-of-a-Gun and More from the Lee Hazlewood Songbook (2016)
- "Funny Face" for Something Else: A Tribute to the Kinks (2017)
- "4'33" for STUMM433 (2019)
- "Come into My Sleep" for The Good Songs (2020)

=== Production credits ===
- Robert Forster – Danger in the Past (1990)
- Once Upon a Time – In the Blink of an Eye (1992)
- Anita Lane – Dirty Pearl (1993)
- The Cruel Sea – The Honeymoon Is Over (1993) (co-producer) (AUS No. 4, also ARIA award for "Best Album" 1994)
- Congo Norvell – Music to Remember Him By (1994, co-producer)
- PJ Harvey – Dance Hall at Louse Point (1996, co-producer)
- PJ Harvey – Stories from the City, Stories from the Sea (2000, co-producer) (UK No. 23, US No. 42, AUS No. 20, and winner of the Mercury Prize 2001)
- Anita Lane – Sex O'Clock (2001)
- Rowland S. Howard – Pop Crimes (2009)
- Hunter Dienna – self-titled EP (2010)
- The Nearly Brothers – You Can't Hide from Your Yesterdays (2010)
- Brian Henry Hooper – Trouble (2010)
- PJ Harvey – Let England Shake (2011, co-producer) (UK No. 8, US No. 32, AUS No. 6, and winner of the Mercury Prize 2011)
- Bambi Lee Savage – Darkness Overshadowed (2012)
- Mazgani – Common Ground (2013, with John Parish)
- Wagons – Acid Rain & Sugar Cane (2014)
- Jess Ribeiro – Kill It Yourself (2015)

== Awards ==
=== ARIA Music Awards ===
The ARIA Music Awards is an annual awards ceremony that recognises excellence, innovation, and achievement across all genres of Australian music. They commenced in 1987.

ARIA Music Awards nominations for Mick Harvey
Year	Nominee / work	Award	Result
1997	To Have & to Hold (with Blixa Bargeld and Nick Cave)	Best Original Soundtrack, Cast or Show Album	Won
2003	Australian Rules	Best Original Soundtrack, Cast or Show Album	Won

- 2001 Mercury Prize: Best Album: PJ Harvey Stories from the City, Stories from the Sea (Mick Harvey: co-producer)
- 2006 AFI Awards: Best Original Music Score (Suburban Mayhem)
- 2011 Mercury Prize: Best Album: PJ Harvey Let England Shake (Mick Harvey: co-producer)

== See also ==
- List of Caulfield Grammar School people

== Sources ==
- Inner City Sound – Clinton Walker
- Bad Seed: A biography of Nick Cave – Ian Johnston
- The life and music of Nick Cave: An illustrated biography – Maximilian Dax & Johannes Beck
