= Wild God =

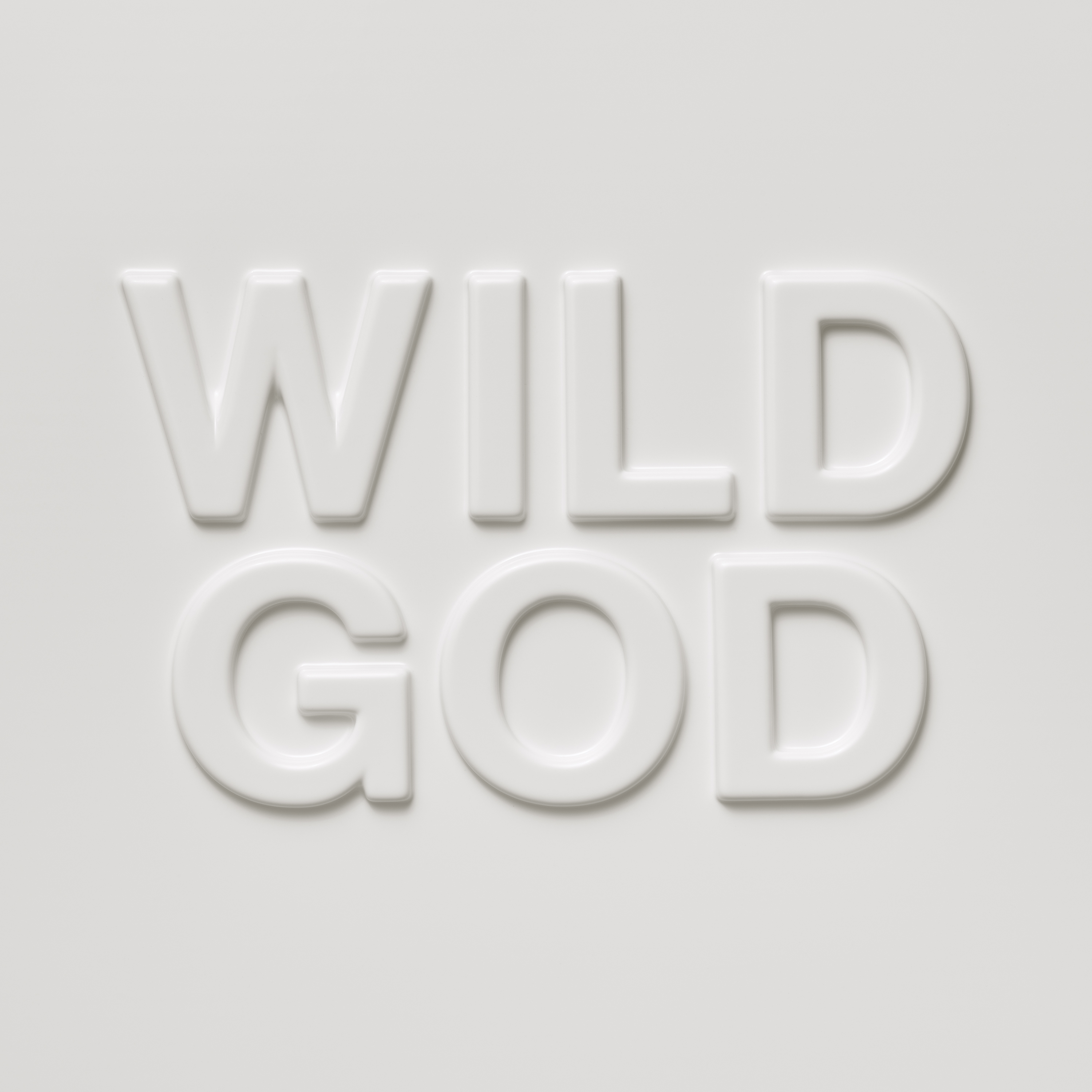

Studio album by Nick Cave and the Bad Seeds
- Released: 30 August 2024
- Studios: Miraval (Correns); Soundtree (London)
- Genre: Alternative rock
- Length: 44:21
- Label: PIAS
- Producers: Nick Cave; Warren Ellis

Nick Cave and the Bad Seeds chronology
B-Sides & Rarities Part II (2021)	Wild God (2024)	Live God (2025)

Singles from Wild God
- 1. "Wild God" Released: 6 March 2024; 2. "Frogs" Released: 31 May 2024; 3. "Long Dark Night" Released: 26 July 2024; 4. "Final Rescue Attempt" Released: 5 September 2025

Wild God is the eighteenth studio album by the Australian rock band Nick Cave and the Bad Seeds, released on 30 August 2024 on PIAS. It was produced Nick Cave and Warren Ellis and mixed by Dave Fridmann.

Whereas the previous album, Ghosteen (2019), was primarily a collaboration between Cave and Ellis, Wild God is the first studio album to feature the full participation of the Bad Seeds since Skeleton Tree (2016). It also features the Radiohead bassist Colin Greenwood. "Wild God", "Frogs" and "Long Dark Night" were released as singles.

The album reached number one on the charts in Belgium, the Netherlands and Switzerland and placed in the top ten across Europe. It also received positive reviews. Wild God received two nominations at the 67th Annual Grammy Awards for Best Alternative Music Album and Best Alternative Music Performance ("Song of the Lake"). It was also nominated for the 2024 Australian Music Prize and shortlisted for Best LP/EP at the 2025 Rolling Stone Australia Awards.

== Background ==
Wild God… there's no fucking around with this record. When it hits, it hits. It lifts you. It moves you. I love that about it.

— Nick Cave on Wild God

Cave began writing the album on New Year's Day 2023. Recording took place at Miraval Studios, Provence and Soundtree in London. Cave produced alongside Warren Ellis, while mixing was handled by David Fridmann. Additional performers include bassist Colin Greenwood and guitarist Luis Almau. Wild God sees the band exploring themes of "convention and experimentation" that are set to enhance "rich imagery and emotive narratives". In a statement, Cave hopes the album has the "effect on listeners" that it had on him. He describes it as a "complicated record" but simultaneously "deeply and joyously infectious". As their records reflect the band's "emotional state", Cave shared the impression that they are "happy" this time around.

The album's full-band aesthetic was influenced by the band's 2022 European tour, which found the band members convening for the first time since the cancellation of their planned Ghosteen tour, due to the COVID-19 pandemic. Ellis said: "The last few records, we'd been deconstructing the sound. When we did the 2022 festival shows, it was so fantastic to find that beautiful chaotic energy of the Bad Seeds." Guitarist George Vjestica elaborated, "After COVID, the tour we did in 2022, there was a pure joy in getting back on the road and playing again. And I think Nick felt that too. And I think that fed back into this record."

Cave and Ellis decided upon the album title, Wild God, in November 2023 after finishing the mixing process at David Fridmann's studio in Cassadaga, New York. Cave had three potential title options, noting: "Warren asked me what we were going to call the record. I had three ideas, which were titles of songs on the album, 'Conversion', 'Joy' and 'Wild God'. We discussed the titles and thought Conversion was probably too overtly religious and may scare people off; we both liked Joy, but I was concerned that the word 'Joy' might be interpreted as 'Happy', which felt misleading. This left Wild God. We both agreed that this was a powerful and mysterious title for an album."

== Recording ==
The first recording sessions took place at Soundtree studios in Shoreditch, London, in early 2023, with Nick Cave on piano and Warren Ellis on synthesiser. Cave said the sessions "immediately sounded good" but that the sparse nature of the recordings became "a major problem. There's a sort of falseness to that after a while."

Longtime Bad Seeds bassist Martyn P. Casey was based in Australia and unable to quickly attend the recording sessions. Cave and Ellis invited Greenwood, who had played on their 2022 Carnage tour, due to his proximity to the studio. Cave said, "It was not the intention to have Colin replace Martyn. He was just up the road. As soon as Colin was in there, it lost that ambient, free-floating thing. Everything became more external." Greenwood said Cave and Ellis "were thinking about how to make it more open-ended – less hermetic, perhaps. I sat there with my bass and listened to them and tried not to get in the way. If I heard something I liked, I tried to respond to it."

The Bad Seeds members contribued fully to the recording process for the first time since Skeleton Tree (2016). Guitarist George Vjestica noted: "On Wild God, it felt like there was more space to express yourself. But you don't get many passes. You've got to be on it. For instance, on 'Frogs' - the first night we got to France I tried something out that just wasn't working. I was like, 'Oh, Christ'. Overnight, I couldn't stop thinking about Glen Campbell's "Wichita Lineman", the simplicity of that guitar line. And the next morning I went in and did it in one take. Just very simple and it absolutely fit. Nick and Colin Greenwood were like, 'That's the one.'"

Longtime drummer Thomas Wydler, who retired from touring with the Bad Seeds in 2018 for health reasons, stated: "The first second I started playing on the new songs it was clear it was going to be different from Ghosteen, Skeleton Tree and Push the Sky Away. This is maybe the first really 'rock' record I've played on. Maybe we created our own gospel music or something like that, but in an abstract way." Casey said, "Every album turns out different. Maybe Wild God is a resurgence of the Bad Seeds. [...] I guess the last few records have been off in some other land — they've been about Nick dealing with the awful things that have happened to him. But Nick always writes what he wants to write. There's no pandering to what's popular, even in what you might call alternative music. He's a singular kind of writer."

Touring member Carly Paradis, who first joined the band on their 2022 tour, contributed whistling to "O Wow O Wow (How Wonderful She Is)", and said: "I can whistle pretty good and I do bird calls. I'm from Canada, when I'm up north at my cottage, there's a certain bird I can call, a warbler, and it'll fly to me." This song was a tribute to Cave’s former girlfriend Anita Lane, who was also an early member of the Bad Seeds on piano and vocals, and features her voice which was recorded over the telephone in 2019 before her death in 2021.

== Touring ==
On 15 March 2024, alongside the album's announcement, Cave revealed dates for a European arena tour beginning on 24 September in Oberhausen's Rudolf Weber-Arena and ending on 17 November in the Paris Accor Arena. The opening acts in mainland Europe were Dry Cleaning or the Murder Capital, while Black Country, New Road supported in the UK, Dublin and Paris. Greenwood joined the tour after Casey fell ill. On 6 September 2024, Cave announced 2025 North American dates for the Wild God tour beginning 15 April in Boston's Agganis Arena and ending on 14 May in San Francisco's Bill Graham Civic Auditorium. It was the band's first North American tour since 2018.

== Critical reception ==
Professional ratings
Aggregate scores
Source	Rating
AnyDecentMusic?	8.5/10
Metacritic	89/100
Review scores
Source	Rating
AllMusic	4/5 stars
Clash	9/10
The Daily Telegraph	4/5 stars
DIY	5/5 stars
The Guardian	5/5 stars
The Independent	5/5 stars
NME	4/5 stars
Pitchfork	8.0/10
Rolling Stone	3.5/5 stars
Uncut	9/10

Metacritic gave the album a score of 89/100, which the website categorised as "universal acclaim". Alexis Petridis, writing in The Guardian, gave Wild God five stars, writing "this masterpiece will make you fall back in love with life". Highlighting the unusually joyous nature of a Nick Cave and the Bad Seeds album, he observed songs that "frequently surge into vast, ecstatic exhalations" with "Cave's extemporised vocal sounding increasingly rapturous over the top." He concluded, "Packed with remarkable songs, its mood of what you might call radical optimism is potent and contagious. You leave it feeling better than you did previously: an improving experience, in the best sense of the phrase."

The Independent also gave the album five stars noting how Cave frequently "swings between doubt and faith." They observed that "Melodies flood through the music and then disappear like currents. Wild God can feel fathomless, but it leaves you buoyant."

NME praised the record as the band's most upbeat offering in decades but still "coloured with the many shades of a life so challenging and weathered." They awarded the album 4 out of 5 stars, reserving particular praise for the song "O Wow O Wow (How Wonderful She Is)", describing it as one of Cave's "most masterful love songs" and ranking it alongside "Into My Arms".

=== Year-end lists ===
Numerous critics and publications listed Wild God in their year-end ranking of the best albums of 2024, often inside the top ten.

Select year-end rankings for Wild God
Publication/critic	Accolade	Rank	Ref.
GQ	Best Albums of 2024 (so far)	Unranked	
MOJO	The Best Albums Of 2024	2	
Rolling Stone	100 Best Albums of 2024	97	
Rough Trade UK	Albums of the Year 2024	36	
Uncut	80 Best Albums of 2024	1	

== Track listing ==
All lyrics are written by Nick Cave; all music is composed by Cave and Warren Ellis.

Wild God track listing
No.	Title	Length
1.	"Song of the Lake"	3:36
2.	"Wild God"	5:19
3.	"Frogs"	4:34
4.	"Joy"	6:13
5.	"Final Rescue Attempt"	3:56
6.	"Conversion"	5:17
7.	"Cinnamon Horses"	5:16
8.	"Long Dark Night"	3:33
9.	"O Wow O Wow (How Wonderful She Is)"	4:33
10.	"As the Waters Cover the Sea"	2:04
Total length:		44:21

== Personnel ==
Nick Cave and the Bad Seeds

- Nick Cave – vocals, piano, backing vocals
- Warren Ellis – synthesizer, piano, flute, violin, tenor guitar, keyboards, backing vocals
- George Vjestica – electric guitar, acoustic guitar
- Martyn P. Casey – bass
- Thomas Wydler – drums
- Jim Sclavunos – vibraphone, percussion, backing vocals

Guests

- Carly Paradis – whistling (track 9)
- Colin Greenwood – bass
- Luis Almau – acoustic guitar
- Anita Lane – voice (track 9)
- Double R Collective – backing vocals

== Charts ==
=== Weekly charts ===
Weekly chart performance for Wild God
Chart (2024)	Peak position
Australian Albums (ARIA)	2
Austrian Albums (Ö3 Austria)	2
Belgian Albums (Ultratop Flanders)	1
Belgian Albums (Ultratop Wallonia)	1
Croatian International Albums (HDU)	1
Czech Albums (ČNS IFPI)	50
Danish Albums (Hitlisten)	4
Dutch Albums (Album Top 100)	1
Finnish Albums (Suomen virallinen lista)	5
French Albums (SNEP)	2
German Albums (Offizielle Top 100)	2
Hungarian Physical Albums (MAHASZ)	7
Icelandic Albums (Tónlistinn)	9
Irish Albums (Official Charts)	9
Italian Albums (FIMI)	15
New Zealand Albums (RMNZ)	4
Norwegian Albums (VG-lista)	5
Polish Albums (ZPAV)	2
Portuguese Albums (AFP)	2
Scottish Albums (Official Charts)	2
Spanish Albums (Promusicae)	6
Swedish Albums (Sverigetopplistan)	7
Swiss Albums (Schweizer Hitparade)	1
UK Albums (Official Charts)	5
UK Independent Albums (Official Charts)	1
US Billboard 200	66
US Independent Albums (Billboard)	11
US Top Rock & Alternative Albums (Billboard)	15

=== Year-end charts ===
Year-end chart performance for Wild God
Chart (2024)	Position
Australian Artist Albums (ARIA)	19
Belgian Albums (Ultratop Flanders)	28
Belgian Albums (Ultratop Wallonia)	189
Croatian International Albums (HDU)	5
Swiss Albums (Schweizer Hitparade)	74
