= Live God =

Live album by Nick Cave and the Bad Seeds
- Released: 5 December 2025
- Recorded: September–November 2024
- Venues: Accor Arena, Paris
- Length: 84:12 (LP); 99:14 (CD / digital)
- Labels: Bad Seed Ltd.; PIAS
- Producers: Nick Cave; Warren Ellis

Nick Cave and the Bad Seeds chronology
Wild God (2024)	Live God (2025)

Live God is a live double album by the Australian band Nick Cave and the Bad Seeds. It was released on 5 December 2025 on the labels Bad Seed Ltd. and PIAS Recordings and was produced by Nick Cave and Warren Ellis.

== Background and recording ==
Live God was recorded between September and November 2024 while the band was on tour in Europe in support of their album Wild God (2024). The last show of that leg of the Wild God Tour was at the Accor Arena in Paris, where they recorded at least some of the album, including "Wild God".

In Live God, the Bad Seeds perform most of Wild God, interspersing the record with various songs from Cave's career.

== Promotion and release ==
On 22 October 2025, the band announced Live God and previewed the record with a video of their performance of "Wild God". The album was later released on 5 December 2025 on the band's label Bad Seed Ltd. and PIAS Recordings. The CD and digital versions additionally contain "Long Dark Night" and "O Wow O Wow (How Wonderful She Is)" from Wild God and "White Elephant" from the Nick Cave and Warren Ellis album Carnage (2021).

== Critical reception ==
Professional ratings
Aggregate scores
Source	Rating
Metacritic	88/100
Review scores
Source	Rating
Clash	8/10
Classic Rock	7/10
Classic Rock Italia	8/10
Hot Press	9/10
The Irish Times	4/5 stars
Mojo	5/5 stars
Spectrum Culture	84%
The Times	4/5 stars
Uncut	8/10

According to the review aggregator Metacritic, Live God received "universal acclaim" based on a weighted average score of 88 out of 100 from 5 critic scores. In an 8 out of 10 review for Clash, Chris Connor said that the set "captures the breadth of sounds Cave has dabbled in" and that it "should entice anyone who hasn't had the chance to see the icon in concert, still with plenty of fire in his belly."

== Track listing ==
All lyrics are written by Nick Cave; all music is composed by Cave and Warren Ellis.

Live God track listing
No.	Title	Album	Length
1.	"Frogs"	Wild God (2024)	5:09
2.	"Wild God"	Wild God	5:19
3.	"O Children"	Abattoir Blues / The Lyre of Orpheus (2004)	5:48
4.	"From Her to Eternity"	From Her to Eternity (1984)	6:24
5.	"Long Dark Night" ( (Note: "Long Dark Night", "White Elephant", and "O Wow O Wow (How Wonderful She Is)" are exclusive to CD and digital releases.))	Wild God	5:14
6.	"Cinnamon Horses"	Wild God	5:24
7.	"Tupelo"	The Firstborn Is Dead (1985)	7:57
8.	"Conversion"	Wild God	5:51
9.	"Bright Horses"	Ghosteen (2019)	5:22
10.	"Joy"	Wild God	6:55
11.	"I Need You"	Skeleton Tree (2016)	4:31
12.	"Carnage"	Carnage (2021)	5:28
13.	"Red Right Hand"	Let Love In (1994)	6:32
14.	"White Elephant"	Carnage	4:52
15.	"O Wow O Wow (How Wonderful She Is)"	Wild God	4:56
16.	"Papa Won't Leave You, Henry"	Henry's Dream (1992)	6:18
17.	"Into My Arms"	The Boatman's Call (1997)	4:54
18.	"As the Waters Cover the Sea"	Wild God	2:20
Total length:			99:14

== Personnel ==
Musician credits are adapted from Uncut magazine, with technical credits from Tidal.

=== Musicians ===
- Nick Cave – vocals, piano
- Warren Ellis – violin, tenor guitar, synthesiser
- George Vjestica – guitar
- Colin Greenwood – bass
- Larry Mullins – drums, timpani, percussion
- Carly Paradis – keyboards
- Jim Sclavunos – percussion, vibraphone, tubular bells, drums
- Wendi Rose, Janet Ramus, T. Jae Cole, Miça Townshend – backing vocals, percussion

=== Technical ===
- Nick Cave, Warren Ellis – production, mixing
- Luis Almau – mixing

== Charts ==
Chart performance for Live God
Chart (2025)	Peak position
Australian Albums (ARIA)	22
Austrian Albums (Ö3 Austria)	9
Belgian Albums (Ultratop Flanders)	7
Belgian Albums (Ultratop Wallonia)	25
Croatian International Albums (HDU)	5
Dutch Albums (Album Top 100)	22
French Albums (SNEP)	95
French Rock & Metal Albums (SNEP)	4
German Albums (Offizielle Top 100)	14
German Rock & Metal Albums (Offizielle Top 100)	4
Irish Albums (IRMA)	53
Irish Independent Albums (IRMA)	8
Polish Albums (ZPAV)	11
Portuguese Albums (AFP)	87
Scottish Albums (Official Charts)	7
Spanish Albums (Promusicae)	97
Swiss Albums (Schweizer Hitparade)	12
UK Albums (Official Charts)	33
UK Independent Albums (Official Charts)	2
