= Distant Sky: Live in Copenhagen =

EP by Nick Cave and the Bad Seeds
- Released: 28 September 2018
- Recorded: 20 October 2017
- Venue: Royal Arena (Copenhagen)
- Length: 28:45
- Label: Bad Seed
- Producer: Warren Ellis; Nick Cave

Nick Cave and the Bad Seeds chronology
Lovely Creatures: The Best of Nick Cave and the Bad Seeds (2017)	Distant Sky: Live in Copenhagen (2018)	Ghosteen (2019)

Distant Sky: Live in Copenhagen is an extended play by the Australian rock band Nick Cave and the Bad Seeds. It was released on 28 September 2018 on Bad Seed Ltd. Containing four tracks from a performance at the Royal Arena in Copenhagen, Denmark in October 2017, the EP was preceded by a concert film of the same name directed by David Barnard. Critical response to Distant Sky: Live in Copenhagen was unanimously positive and the EP charted worldwide, reaching number one on the United Kingdom's Vinyl Albums chart.

== Recording ==
Distant Sky: Live in Copenhagen was recorded live at the Royal Arena in Copenhagen, Denmark on 20 October 2017 as part of the tour for Nick Cave and the Bad Seeds' sixteenth studio album Skeleton Tree (2016). Danish soprano Else Torp is featured on "Distant Sky", the Skeleton Tree song after which the EP is titled.

Warren Ellis and Nick Cave produced Distant Sky: Live in Copenhagen the following year. The selected four tracks from the performance were mixed by Matt Mysko, Paul Pritchard and Toby Hubert at Abbey Road Studios in London, England, with Will Shapland supervising. The EP was subsequently mastered by John Davies at Metropolis Mastering in London.

== Release ==
Distant Sky: Live in Copenhagen was released on 28 September 2018 on Bad Seed Ltd, the band's own imprint. It was issued as a 12-inch record and digital download and made available for streaming. The EP was preceded by a concert film of the same name, directed by David Barnard, that was released in theatres worldwide for one night only on 12 April 2018. The film was later made available in full on Nick Cave's official website for a period between April 19 and 22 and in individual parts on YouTube.

Upon its release Distant Sky: Live in Copenhagen charted in several European countries, including Denmark itself. The EP was particularly successful in the United Kingdom, where it placed in the top 10 on the Independent Albums and Record Store charts and peaked at number one on the Vinyl Albums Chart in its first week of release.

== Reception ==
Professional ratings
Aggregate scores
Source	Rating
Metacritic	82/100
Review scores
Source	Rating
Clash	8/10
Drowned in Sound	9/10
No Ripcord	9/10
Rolling Stone	3.5/5 stars

At Metacritic, which assigns a normalised rating out of 100 to reviews from mainstream critics, Distant Sky: Live in Copenhagen received an average score of 82, based on 4 reviews, indicating "universal acclaim". Writing for Clash, Mat Smith awarded the EP an eight-out-of-ten rating and called it "an extraordinary live document". Smith selected the title track as the highlight, in particular praising Warren Ellis' "mournful" violin performance and Else Torp's "stirring vocal", which he said was "enough to render even the hardest-hearted individual a bawling mess." Drowned in Sound writer Nicoletta Wylde rated Distant Sky: Live in Copenhagen nine out of ten and referred to the EP as "bullet sharp". Wylde, though somewhat critical of the mix, summarised the EP as "glorious" and concluded that Cave's performance was "what happens when a lone wolf suddenly needs to reach out and touch. It's the chaotic scream around loosing [sic] a child. It's a careful help me into the darkness. It’s an invitation to come closer, to hold hands." In another nine-out-of-ten review for No Ripcord, Joe Marvilli said "Nick Cave is still at his peak" and selected both "Jubilee Street" and "Distant Sky" as highlights, adding that "whether they arrive with a bang or a breeze, Cave's songs remain among the most impactful in all of music." Rolling Stone awarded the EP a three-out-of-five-star rating, with reviewer Kory Grow calling the Copenhagen performance "especially vibrant" and referring to the title track as a "standout" that "stays with you."

== Track listing ==
Side A
No.	Title	Lyrics	Music	Length
1.	"Jubilee Street"	Nick Cave	Cave · Warren Ellis	7:54
2.	"Distant Sky"	Cave	Cave · Ellis	6:30
Total length:				14:24

Side B
No.	Title	Lyrics	Music	Length
1.	"From Her to Eternity"	Cave · Anita Lane	Cave · Blixa Bargeld · Hugo Race · Barry Adamson · Mick Harvey	9:00
2.	"The Mercy Seat"	Cave	Cave · Harvey	5:21
Total length:				14:21

== Personnel ==
All personnel credits adapted from Distant Sky: Live in Copenhagen's notes.

Nick Cave and the Bad Seeds

- Nick Cave – vocals, piano
- Warren Ellis – violin, tenor guitar, loops
- Thomas Wydler – drums
- Martyn Casey – bass
- Jim Sclavunos – tambourine, vibraphone, trigger pad, additional drums
- George Vjestica – guitar
- Larry Mullins – keyboards

Additional performers

- Else Torp – vocals (A2)

Technical personnel

- Warren Ellis – production
- Nick Cave – production
- Henrik Nilsson – sound supervising
- Pelle Nilsson – engineering
- Will Shapland – mix engineering supervising
- Matt Mysko – mix engineering
- Paul Pritchard – additional mix engineering
- Toby Hulbert – additional mix engineering
- John Davis – mastering, lacquer cutting

Design personnel

- Hingston Studio – design
- Alexander Weigert – photography

== Charts ==
Chart (2018)	Peak position
Austrian Albums (Ö3 Austria)	67
Danish Albums (Hitlisten)	34
German Albums (Offizielle Top 100)	82
Scottish Albums (OCC)	31
Swiss Albums (Schweizer Hitparade)	66
UK Albums (OCC)	74
UK Independent Albums (OCC)	8

== Release history ==
Region	Date	Format	Label	Catalogue
Worldwide	28 September 2018	12-inch record	Bad Seed Ltd	BS017V
Worldwide	28 September 2018	Digital download · streaming	Bad Seed Ltd	—N/a
