= Lovely Creatures: The Best of Nick Cave and the Bad Seeds =

Greatest hits album by Nick Cave and the Bad Seeds
- Released: 5 May 2017
- Recorded: 1984–2014
- Genres: Blues; Southern Gothic; art rock
- Length: 3:47:53 (deluxe edition)
- Label: Mute
- Producers: Nick Cave; Flood; David Briggs; Tony Cohen; Victor Van Vugt; The Bad Seeds

Nick Cave and the Bad Seeds chronology
Skeleton Tree (2016)	Lovely Creatures: The Best of Nick Cave and the Bad Seeds (2017)	Distant Sky: Live in Copenhagen (2018)

Professional ratings
Aggregate scores
Source	Rating
Metacritic	95/100
Review scores
Source	Rating
Allmusic	4.5/5 stars
The Austin Chronicle	4/5 stars
Clash	9/10
Classic Rock	4.5/5 stars
Exclaim!	8/10
The Independent	5/5 stars
The Line of Best Fit	9/10
Louder Than War	10/10
The New Zealand Herald	4.5/5 stars
Uncut	4.5/5 stars

Lovely Creatures: The Best of Nick Cave and the Bad Seeds is a compilation album by Australian rock band Nick Cave and the Bad Seeds, released on 5 May 2017.

== Track listing ==
=== Two-disc edition ===
Disc 1
No.	Title	Originally appears on:	Length
1.	"Loverman"	Let Love In (1994)	4:57
2.	"Tupelo"	The Firstborn Is Dead (1985)	5:12
3.	"Deanna"	Tender Prey (1988)	3:45
4.	"From Her to Eternity"	From Her to Eternity (1984)	5:35
5.	"The Weeping Song"	The Good Son (1990)	4:21
6.	"Dig, Lazarus, Dig!!!"	Dig, Lazarus, Dig!!! (2008)	3:35
7.	"People Ain't No Good"	The Boatman's Call (1997)	5:40
8.	"Higgs Boson Blues"	Push the Sky Away (2013)	7:50
9.	"Straight to You"	Henry's Dream (1992)	4:35
10.	"Where the Wild Roses Grow"	Murder Ballads (1996)	3:57
Total length:			49:27

Disc 2
No.	Title	Originally appears on:	Length
1.	"Into My Arms"	The Boatman's Call (1997)	4:13
2.	"Love Letter"	No More Shall We Part (2001)	4:04
3.	"Red Right Hand"	Let Love In (1994)	4:49
4.	"The Mercy Seat"	Tender Prey (1988)	5:10
5.	"O Children"	Abattoir Blues / The Lyre of Orpheus (2004)	6:42
6.	"The Ship Song"	The Good Son (1990)	4:44
7.	"Stranger Than Kindness"	Your Funeral... My Trial (1986)	4:43
8.	"Jubilee Street"	Push the Sky Away (2013)	5:03
9.	"Nature Boy"	Abattoir Blues / The Lyre of Orpheus (2004)	3:31
10.	"We No Who U R"	Push the Sky Away (2013)	4:05
11.	"Stagger Lee"	Murder Ballads (1996)	5:14
Total length:			52:18

=== Deluxe edition ===
Disc 1: 1984–1993
No.	Title	Originally appears on:	Length
1.	"From Her to Eternity"	From Her to Eternity (1984)	5:35
2.	"In the Ghetto"	From Her to Eternity (1984)	4:36
3.	"Tupelo"	The Firstborn Is Dead (1985)	7:16
4.	"I'm Gonna Kill That Woman"	Kicking Against the Pricks (1986)	3:44
5.	"The Carny"	Your Funeral... My Trial (1986)	8:01
6.	"Sad Waters"	Your Funeral... My Trial (1986)	4:59
7.	"Stranger Than Kindness"	Your Funeral... My Trial (1986)	4:47
8.	"Scum"	Your Funeral... My Trial (1986)	2:55
9.	"The Mercy Seat"	Tender Prey (1988)	7:18
10.	"Deanna"	Tender Prey (1988)	3:46
11.	"Up Jumped the Devil"	Tender Prey (1988)	5:18
12.	"The Weeping Song"	The Good Son (1990)	4:25
13.	"The Ship Song"	The Good Son (1990)	5:14
14.	"Papa Won't Leave You, Henry"	Henry's Dream (1992)	5:56
15.	"Straight to You"	Henry's Dream (1992)	4:35

Disc 2: 1994–2003
No.	Title	Originally appears on:	Length
1.	"Do You Love Me?"	Let Love In (1994)	5:57
2.	"Nobody's Baby Now"	Let Love In (1994)	3:52
3.	"Loverman"	Let Love In (1994)	6:21
4.	"Red Right Hand"	Let Love In (1994)	6:10
5.	"Stagger Lee"	Murder Ballads (1996)	5:15
6.	"Where the Wild Roses Grow"	Murder Ballads (1996)	3:57
7.	"Into My Arms"	The Boatman's Call (1997)	4:15
8.	"People Ain't No Good"	The Boatman's Call (1997)	5:42
9.	"Brompton Oratory"	The Boatman's Call (1997)	4:06
10.	"(Are You) The One That I've Been Waiting For?"	The Boatman's Call (1997)	4:05
11.	"Come Into My Sleep"	"(Are You) The One That I've Been Waiting For?" single (1997)	3:49
12.	"Love Letter"	No More Shall We Part (2001)	4:05
13.	"God Is in the House"	No More Shall We Part (2001)	5:43
14.	"He Wants You"	Nocturama (2003)	3:31
15.	"Shoot Me Down"	"Bring It On" single (2003)	4:03

Disc 3: 2004–2013
No.	Title	Originally appears on:	Length
1.	"Hiding All Away"	Abattoir Blues / The Lyre of Orpheus (2004)	6:30
2.	"There She Goes, My Beautiful World"	Abattoir Blues / The Lyre of Orpheus (2004)	5:17
3.	"Nature Boy"	Abattoir Blues / The Lyre of Orpheus (2004)	4:54
4.	"Breathless"	Abattoir Blues / The Lyre of Orpheus (2004)	3:14
5.	"Babe, You Turn Me On"	Abattoir Blues / The Lyre of Orpheus (2004)	4:21
6.	"O Children"	Abattoir Blues / The Lyre of Orpheus (2004)	6:46
7.	"Dig, Lazarus, Dig!!!"	Dig, Lazarus, Dig!!! (2008)	4:13
8.	"Night of the Lotus Eaters"	Dig, Lazarus, Dig!!! (2008)	4:54
9.	"We Call Upon the Author"	Dig, Lazarus, Dig!!! (2008)	5:12
10.	"Jesus of the Moon"	Dig, Lazarus, Dig!!! (2008)	3:23
11.	"More News from Nowhere"	Dig, Lazarus, Dig!!! (2008)	7:58
12.	"We No Who U R"	Push the Sky Away (2013)	4:05
13.	"Jubilee Street"	Push the Sky Away (2013)	6:36
14.	"Higgs Boson Blues"	Push the Sky Away (2013)	7:50
15.	"Push the Sky Away"	Push the Sky Away (2013)	4:06

== Charts ==
=== Weekly charts ===
Chart (2017)	Peak position
Australian Albums (ARIA)	8
Austrian Albums (Ö3 Austria)	8
Belgian Albums (Ultratop Flanders)	3
Belgian Albums (Ultratop Wallonia)	55
Dutch Albums (Album Top 100)	12
French Albums (SNEP)	80
German Albums (Offizielle Top 100)	10
Italian Albums (FIMI)	14
New Zealand Albums (RMNZ)	15
Portuguese Albums (AFP)	5
Spanish Albums (Promusicae)	36
Swiss Albums (Schweizer Hitparade)	17
UK Albums (Official Charts)	8
US Top Album Sales (Billboard)	72

=== Year-end charts ===
Chart (2017)	Position
Belgian Albums (Ultratop Flanders)	74
Chart (2018)	Position
Belgian Albums (Ultratop Flanders)	183

== Certifications ==
Region	Certification	Certified units/sales
New Zealand (RMNZ)	Gold	7,500^{‡}
United Kingdom (BPI)	Silver	60,000^{‡}
^{‡} Sales+streaming figures based on certification alone.
