= Ghosteen =

Studio album by Nick Cave and the Bad Seeds
- Released: 4 October 2019
- Recorded: 2018–2019
- Studios: Woodshed (Malibu); NightBird (West Hollywood); Retreat (Brighton); Candy Bomber (Berlin); Air (London)
- Genres: Ambient pop; ambient; electronic
- Length: 68:10
- Labels: Ghosteen; Bad Seed
- Producers: Nick Cave; Warren Ellis

Nick Cave and the Bad Seeds chronology
Distant Sky: Live in Copenhagen (2018)	Ghosteen (2019)	B-Sides & Rarities Part II (2021)

Ghosteen is the seventeenth studio album by the Australian rock band Nick Cave and the Bad Seeds. It was released on 4 October 2019 on Ghosteen Ltd and on 8 November 2019 on Bad Seed Ltd, both the band's own imprints. Ghosteen is a double album—the band's first since Abattoir Blues / The Lyre of Orpheus (2004)—and the final part of a trilogy of albums that includes Push the Sky Away (2013) and Skeleton Tree (2016).

Produced by Nick Cave and Warren Ellis, Ghosteen was written in the aftermath of the death of Cave's son Arthur in 2015. It was recorded primarily in Malibu and West Hollywood, California in the United States, with further sessions in Germany and England. Cave's lyrics are more abstract than his earlier narrative-based writing, and explore themes of loss, death and existentialism, as well as empathy, faith and optimism. Like Skeleton Tree, the album features extensive use of synthesizers, loops and ambient elements, particularly the minimal use of drums and percussion.

Upon its release Ghosteen was met with widespread critical acclaim. It received several perfect scores and is the highest-rated album of 2019 and the 2010s decade (tied with Kendrick Lamar's To Pimp a Butterfly) on Metacritic. The album placed in the top 10 album charts in several countries and was included in several publications' year-end and decade-end lists of best albums. Both European and North American tours in support for Ghosteen were cancelled due to the COVID-19 pandemic, with all shows rescheduled to later dates in 2021.

== Background ==
In July 2015, during the recording sessions for Nick Cave and the Bad Seeds' sixteenth studio album Skeleton Tree (2016), Nick Cave's 15-year-old son Arthur died after falling from the Ovingdean Gap near Brighton, England. Skeleton Tree and the related documentary film One More Time with Feeling were released the following year; Skeleton Tree's lyrical themes and its "bleak and disturbing" sound led to misconceptions that the album was entirely about Arthur's death. The majority of the songs on the album, however, were written prior to his death, with Cave only improvising and amending subsequent lyrics during the album's final sessions.

Nick Cave and the Bad Seeds returned to live performances in January 2017 and four months later released the compilation album Lovely Creatures: The Best of Nick Cave and the Bad Seeds (2017), which was originally due for release in 2015. In April 2018, Cave began a series of initially limited question-and-answer events called Conversations with Nick Cave, in which he explored the relationship with his audience; Cave's efforts in engaging directly with his fans continued in September 2018 when he began a blog, The Red Hand Files, with a similar concept where fans send in questions. In the same month, Cave's longtime keyboardist Conway Savage—a member of the band since 1990—died of a brain tumor about a year after his diagnosis Ghosteen was ultimately dedicated to Savage; however, Nick Cave discussed that the title of the album and lyrical imagery used is based on metaphysical conversations with Arthur. In the weeks after his death, the band released the extended play Distant Sky: Live in Copenhagen (2018) and premiered a full-length concert film of the same name.

== Recording ==
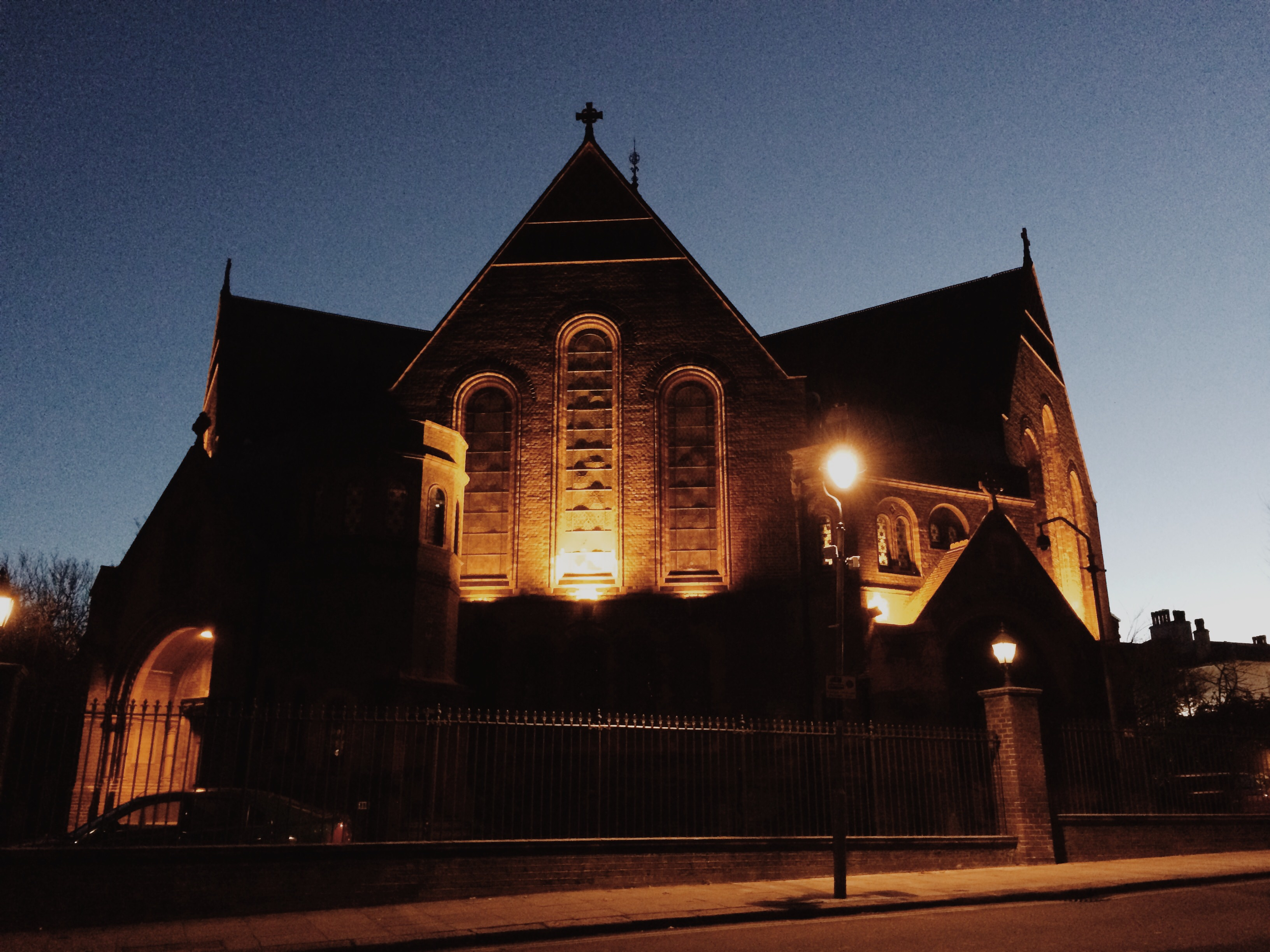
Air Studios in London, England (pictured in 2014), where Ghosteen's orchestration was recorded

Ghosteen was recorded in various locations in the United States, England and Germany between early 2018 and early 2019, with Nick Cave and Warren Ellis heading production. Initial "improv" sessions began at Retreat Studios in Brighton, England in spring 2018, with a minimal setup of Cave on piano and Ellis on a Yamaha Reface DX synthesizer "sketch[ing] out pieces of music" together; the sessions lasted approximately a week.

Ellis selected 20 tracks from the Retreat sessions to continue recording at Woodshed Recording Studios in Malibu and NightBird Recording Studios in West Hollywood, California in the US some months later. The Woodshed sessions—during which most of the album was recorded— were held in a single room "surrounded by an Eden-like garden." Cave and Ellis lodged in the house attached to Woodshed for the duration of the sessions, which was subsequently destroyed by the 2019 California wildfires.

Further sessions were held at Candy Bomber Studio in Berlin, Germany and at Air Studios in London, England. The Air sessions featured the recording of a string ensemble with orchestrator Ben Foster. By January 2019, Cave said he and the Bad Seeds had "nearly finished a new record". Ghosteen was subsequently mixed by Cave, Ellis, Lance Powell and Andrew Dominik at Conway Recording Studios in Los Angeles, California and mastered by Chris Gehringer.

Warren Ellis described the album's recording sessions as having a "spiritual" quality to them, noting: "[The Ghosteen recording process] was seemingly otherworldly. The ten days we did in Malibu were like... they were some of the happiest days I've ever lived on this earth. They were days filled with continual wonder and disbelief at what was coming out. It felt like someone, or something, wanted us to make it. It was a truly spiritual experience."

== Composition ==
Ghosteen is a double album—Nick Cave and the Bad Seeds' first since Abattoir Blues / The Lyre of Orpheus (2004)—and contains 11 tracks. The first part of the album features eight songs, which Nick Cave describes as "the children"; the second part of the album contains two longer songs and a spoken-word track, which he describes as "their parents". In summarising Ghosteen, Cave referred to the album both as "a migrating spirit" and the final part of a trilogy of albums the band began with Push the Sky Away (2013), which also includes Skeleton Tree.

=== Lyrics ===
Cave began writing lyrics for the songs on Ghosteen in February 2017, when a series of images he visualised while in Oslo, Norway became the basis for a later verse in the song "Hollywood". According to Cave, "within this sudden vision the whole of the album presented itself". Cave, who had "very deliberately" not written since the end of 2015 when amending the lyrics for Skeleton Tree, attributed a "new sort of lyrical confidence" to a subsequent process of "enforced shutdown", where he would "confine [him]self to barracks for a while". The album's lyrics were written at Cave's home in Brighton, a change from his usual "disciplined" routine of writing lyrics in a private office. The change in environment and routine led to Cave "amassing a stockpile of lines and thoughts, images and ideas" instead of writing songs in a more traditional manner.

As with the lyrics on Skeleton Tree, Cave abandoned the narrative-based approach he was known for, as he believed it to be "restrictive". Explaining his new approach to writing, Cave said: "The idea that we live life in a straight line, like a story, seems to me to be increasingly absurd and, more than anything, a kind of intellectual convenience … There is a pure heart, but all around it is chaos." In the first-ever issue of The Red Hand Files, Cave elaborated that he found an authentic "way to write beyond the trauma … that deals with all manner of issues but does not turn its back on the issue of the death of my child". He said this new-found method allowed him to write "beyond the personal into a state of wonder. In doing so the colour came back to things with a renewed intensity and the world seemed clear and bright and new."

"At times Ghosteen may feel unmoored and homeless, but it is pointed firmly toward paradise, the crew is joyous, the world smiles, and the sun bursts over the edge of the earth."

— Nick Cave commenting on the mood of Ghosteen, in response to whether it was uplifting or sad

Several publications described Ghosteen's lyrics as dealing with themes of loss, death, grief, and existentialism, but also noted positive themes such as empathy, faith and optimism. Several lyrical motifs and phrases are repeated and referenced throughout different songs, as well as recurring imagery of nature, the elements and Christianity. In addition to Cave's Christian imagery, the lyrics for the closing track "Hollywood" reference the story of Kisa Gotami, a Buddhist arhat who seeks help from the Buddha after the death of her child and discovers that "no one is untouched by loss." Cave himself later commented on the inclusion of the Kisa story, saying it "had been of great significance and comfort to me for years and at some point I jotted it down in verse form, completely independent of anything else, and with no intention of it being a song."

=== Music ===
Described by Pitchfork as Nick Cave and the Bad Seeds' "most musically esoteric record", Ghosteen is an ambient, ambient pop and electronic music album. Like Skeleton Tree, it features extensive use of analogue synthesizers, sparse piano, choral harmonies and drones. Orchestral strings are also a prominent feature of the album; the strings were arranged by conductor Ben Foster, with assistance from Sam Thompson. A five-piece string ensemble—featuring two violins, viola, cello and double bass—are featured in addition to Warren Ellis' violin. Other instrumentation on the album includes several woodwinds, gamelan chimes, an ondes Martenot and tablas.

Several critics emphasised Ghosteen's infrequent use of Thomas Wydler's drums and Jim Sclavunos' percussion in contrast to the band's previous albums. Wydler had recorded drum tracks for several songs, but Cave felt "the drums anchored the songs to the ground and didn't allow them to float". Most of Wydler's tracks were subsequently removed from the final mix, a decision that Cave said was "not made lightly or on a whim, rather it was a tough artistic decision determined by the needs of the songs themselves."

"Hollywood"
The closing track features Nick Cave's sparse use of piano alongside Warren Ellis' analogue synthesizer and loops.

All of the music on Ghosteen was composed together by Cave and Ellis. Describing their writing process as "something chemical", Andrew Dominik—who co-mixed the album and who was present at the Woodshed sessions in 2018—said that "Nick is more into formal ideas of structure and whether or not a piece of music sounds good. Warren doesn't give a fuck about anything except how a piece of music feels. Nick doesn't really let his control go, but working with somebody like Warren allows him to move … They react to each other." "Hollywood" was based around a loop and "circular synth chords" that were originally composed by Ellis, which Cave further improvised on top of. The original "Hollywood" jam was significantly longer and only the final 15 minutes were edited for use as the album version, as Cave considered the track mostly "unusable" apart from the final "mysterious and compelling" section.

Cave—usually known for his "stiff baritone"— sings on several tracks in a falsetto vocal register, which has been noted for its "quavering, trembling" and "tremulous" quality.

== Packaging ==
Ghosteen's title is a combination of the word "ghost" and the Irish-language suffix "ín" (anglicised as "een"), which translates to English as "little", "small" or "benevolent". Cave took the title from a book about Irish tinkers, in which the author believes his crying child has been possessed by a ghost. However, the title has often been misinterpreted as a portmanteau of "ghost" and "teen".

Ghosteen's sleeve was designed by Cave and Hingston Studio, an independent creative agency based in London which had designed several previous Nick Cave and the Bad Seeds' releases. The album's front cover art features an edited version of The Breath of Life, a 2001 painting by the artist Tom duBois from his Eden series. It depicts the biblical Garden of Eden, with various wildlife and colourful scenery. Creative Review's Rachael Steven commented that "in an era of … record sleeves with dark and dystopian themes, the image stands out for its radiant optimism", while The Observer's Kitty Empire described the artwork as a "kitsch paradise" that signified "a radical change of emotional landscape" for the band. The album's inner sleeve features photographs of Cave and Warren Ellis shot by Matthew Thorne.

== Release ==
Ghosteen was released on 4 October 2019 on streaming services and as a digital download on Ghosteen Ltd. Double CD and LP editions were released a month later on 8 November on Bad Seed Ltd; both Ghosteen and Bad Seed are the band's own imprints. The album was announced by Nick Cave in response to a fan question on The Red Hand Files, on 23 September. The title, track listing and brief descriptions of the album's songs were revealed; a second follow-up post the same day included the album's cover art. The lyrics to "Fireflies", Ghosteen's penultimate track, had previously been published in the first-ever issue of The Red Hand Files a year prior.

Several album-listening events were held in 33 cities in Australia, Europe and the US on 3 October, alongside a worldwide YouTube stream featuring an animated lyric film directed by Tom Hingston. The film, which was later released as separate parts per song, features "a kaleidoscopic backdrop that shift[s] in colour and texture as the viewer passe[s] through the sequence – each vista making subtle reference to the theme behind the individual song."

In support of Ghosteen, Nick Cave and the Bad Seeds announced a 33-date European and UK tour, due to begin on 19 April 2020 in Lisbon, Portugal and conclude on 17 June in Tel Aviv, Israel. An 18-date North American tour, beginning on 16 September in Minneapolis, Minnesota, US and concluding on 17 October in Vancouver, British Columbia, Canada, was also later announced. A month prior to its commencement, it was announced that the European and UK tour was cancelled in response to the COVID-19 pandemic, with all shows rescheduled to later dates in 2021; three months later the North American tour was also cancelled. In lieu of the cancelled shows, Cave recorded a solo performance that June at Alexandra Palace's West Hall in London, which featured songs from Ghosteen. The full performance was streamed globally as a concert film, Idiot Prayer: Nick Cave Alone at Alexandra Palace, on 23 July. An extended version of the film, featuring four songs omitted from the original stream, was released in cinemas worldwide on 5 November, followed by double CD and LP, download and streaming releases on 22 November. Songs from Ghosteen were first performed by Cave and Ellis with singers and a string quartet in the documentary film This Much I Know to Be True, directed by Andrew Dominik and released in 2022. The documentary was filmed in spring 2021 before Cave and Ellis's UK tour.

== Reception ==
=== Critical response ===
Professional ratings
Aggregate scores
Source	Rating
AnyDecentMusic?	9.0/10
Metacritic	96/100
Review scores
Source	Rating
AllMusic	4.5/5 stars
The A.V. Club	A
The Daily Telegraph	5/5 stars
The Guardian	5/5 stars
The Independent	5/5 stars
NME	5/5 stars
The Observer	5/5 stars
Pitchfork	8.8/10
Rolling Stone	4.5/5 stars
The Times	5/5 stars

Ghosteen received widespread acclaim from critics. At Metacritic, which assigns a weighted average rating out of 100 to reviews from mainstream publications, it received an average score of 96, based on 28 reviews, making it the highest-scoring album of 2019. Writing for The Guardian, Alexis Petridis summarised that Ghosteen featured "the most beautiful songs [Cave] has ever recorded" and awarded it a full five-out-of-five-star rating. Petridis considered the album to be "an infinitely warmer, sweeter sibling" to Skeleton Tree, noting that "it continues and extends the weightless, drifting style of its two predecessors." In another five-star review for NME, Elizabeth Aubrey said "if Skeleton Tree gave a glimpse into grief in its immediate aftermath, Ghosteen is a grief considered", drawing comparisons between Cave's lyrics and C. S. Lewis' A Grief Observed (1960), in that the album "feels like the trying-to-make-sense stage of grief, even when there's often no sense to be found." Aubrey praised Ghosteen as "a work of extraordinary, unsettling scope", calling it the Bad Seeds' most beautiful album "and also one of the most singularly devastating."

The Independent reviewer Helen Brown called Ghosteen "astonishing" in a five-out-of-five-star review, praising in particular Cave's vocals and lyrics and Warren Ellis' use of analogue synthesizers, which she described as "a warm cloud of ambient solace". Clash reviewer Josh Gray awarded Ghosteen a nine-out-of-ten rating, calling the album "another chapter in Cave's captivating quest for meaningful connection in a world where we so often feel disconnected", and surmising that Ghosteen is "not a blissful or comfortable album, but it is a hopeful one … another open letter straight from artist to audience that cuts right to the core of what means to have loved, lost and loved again." The A.V. Club's Marty Sartini Garner gave the album an A rating, praising its instrumentation, the otherworldly and spiritual quality of Cave's lyrics and its surprising accessibility.

In a full five-star review for The Observer, Kitty Empire praised the "subtle evolutions in mood and instrumentation" in the band's sound on Ghosteen, which she said "come to peaks that are made all the more stunning by their scarcity." Empire drew comparisons to "the gravitas" of Leonard Cohen and the "hoarse, harsh beauty" of Scott Walker's final releases. Pitchfork rated the album 8.8 out of 10, with reviewer Grayson Haver Currin calling it "sublime" and saying it "may be the most poignant album of [Cave's] storied career." Currin further praised Ghosteen's lyrical balance between abstract fantasies and the reality of grief, concluding that "you don’t need to be an expert in Cave's wider cosmology to be swept inside of Ghosteen … You only need the ability to suffer and the desire to survive." Writing in Hot Press, Pat Carty stated that Ghosteen features "an artist laying himself bare" and called it "art as bleak as it is beautiful, and one can only hope it offers some sort of catharsis – some modicum of relief – to its creator."

In a year-end essay for Slate, Ann Powers cited Ghosteen as one of her favorite albums from 2019 and proof that the format is not dead but rather undergoing a "metamorphosis". She added that concept albums had reemerged through the culturally relevant autobiographical narratives of artists such as Cave, who "offered a grand tour of his own haunted house of mourning four years after the accidental death of his son".

=== Commercial performance ===
Ghosteen placed in the top ten of several international album charts, including Australia, Austria, Belgium, Denmark, Finland, Germany, Hungary, Ireland, Italy, Poland, Scotland, Spain, Sweden, Switzerland and the United Kingdom. It peaked at number one in Belgium on Flanders' Ultratop albums chart, in Portugal on the Associação Fonográfica Portuguesa (AFP) albums chart, as well as multiple UK charts, including the Independent Albums and Vinyl Albums charts.

Ghosteen was the best-selling LP in the UK in its first week of physical release, with 15,135 copies sold. It previously sold 6,396 copies in the UK its first week of digital-only release. By the end of 2019, Ghosteen had sold 30,929 copies overall in the UK—with streams accounting for 12.5 per cent of sales—and was the twenty-sixth best-selling LP of the year. In January 2020 Ghosteen was certified Gold in Belgium, with 15,000 copies sold.

== Accolades ==
At Metacritic, Ghosteen is the highest-rated album of 2019, the second highest-rated album of 2010s overall and the sixth highest-rated album of all time. It was ranked as the best album of 2019 by Far Out, Louder Than War, Mojo, musicOMH, The Observer, The Skinny and The Times. Ghosteen was further featured in the top ten of various publications' year-end lists, placing at number two in The Line of Best Fit, Treble and Uncut; number three in the Chicago Tribune, Slant Magazine and Under the Radar; number five in Q; number seven in The A.V. Club, BrooklynVegan, The Independent, PopMatters and Stereogum; number eight in GQ and The Guardian; and number ten by BBC 6 Music. In addition, Ghosteen was included in several publications' decade-end lists of best albums of the 2010s. The album was ranked at number 17 by The Independent, number 28 by Slant Magazine, number 50 by BrooklynVegan, number 65 by Treble, number 72 by Stereogum and number 87 by Rolling Stone.

Ghosteen was nominated for Best Australian Album at the 2020 NME Awards, Best Independent Album at the 2020 Association of Independent Music (Aim) Independent Music Awards, Best Album at the 2020 Ivor Novello Awards, Best Independent Rock Album or EP at the 2020 Australian Independent Record Labels Association (Air) Awards and was shortlisted for the fifteenth annual Australian Music Prize.

== Track listing ==
All lyrics are written by Nick Cave; all music is composed by Cave and Warren Ellis.

Part 1: The Children
No.	Title	Length
1.	"Spinning Song"	4:43
2.	"Bright Horses"	4:52
3.	"Waiting for You"	3:54
4.	"Night Raid"	5:07
5.	"Sun Forest"	6:46
6.	"Galleon Ship"	4:14
7.	"Ghosteen Speaks"	4:02
8.	"Leviathan"	4:47
Total length:		38:25

Part 2: The Parents
No.	Title	Length
1.	"Ghosteen"	12:10
2.	"Fireflies"	3:23
3.	"Hollywood"	14:12
Total length:		29:45

== Personnel ==
All personnel credits sourced from Ghosteen's album notes.

Nick Cave and the Bad Seeds

- Nick Cave – vocals, piano, synthesizer, backing vocals
- Warren Ellis – synthesizer, loops, flute, violin, piano, backing vocals
- Thomas Wydler – drums
- Martyn Casey – bass
- Jim Sclavunos – vibraphone, percussion
- George Vjestica – guitar

Additional performers

- Augustin Viard – ondes Martenot
- Kaushlesh "Garry" Purohit – tabla
- Marianne Faithfull – spoken word on Galleon Ship

Orchestral performers

- Ben Foster – string arrangement, conducting
- Sam Thompson – string arrangement assistance
- Tom Pigott-Smith – leading
- Steve Morris – leading of seconds
- Bruce White – first viola
- Nick Cooper – first cello
- Mary Scully – first double bass

Technical personnel

- Nick Cave – production, mixing
- Warren Ellis – production, mixing
- Lance Powell – recording, mixing
- Kevin Paul – recording
- Ben Thackeray – recording
- Jake Jackson – recording
- Alex Csak – recording assistance
- Kaushlesh "Garry" Purohit – recording assistance
- Richard Biethan – recording assistance
- Ingo Krauss – recording assistance
- Oliver Klemp – recording assistance
- John Prestage – recording assistance
- Andrew Dominik – mixing
- John Armstrong – mixing assistance
- Chris Gehringer – mastering, lacquer cutting

Design personnel

- Tom duBois – cover art
- Matthew Thorne – photography
- Nick Cave – sleeve design
- Hingston Studio – sleeve design

== Charts ==
=== Weekly charts ===
Chart (2019)	Peak position
Australian Albums (ARIA)	2
Austrian Albums (Ö3 Austria)	3
Belgian Albums (Ultratop Flanders)	1
Belgian Albums (Ultratop Wallonia)	10
Canadian Albums (Billboard)	93
Croatian International Albums (HDU)	1
Czech Albums (ČNS IFPI)	47
Danish Albums (Hitlisten)	5
Dutch Albums (Album Top 100)	12
Finnish Albums (Suomen virallinen lista)	7
French Albums (SNEP)	22
German Albums (Offizielle Top 100)	6
Hungarian Albums (MAHASZ)	6
Irish Albums (IRMA)	5
Italian Albums (FIMI)	5
Lithuanian Albums (AGATA)	29
New Zealand Albums (RMNZ)	11
Norwegian Albums (VG-lista)	16
Polish Albums (ZPAV)	4
Portuguese Albums (AFP)	1
Scottish Albums (Official Charts)	4
Slovak Albums (ČNS IFPI)	38
Spanish Albums (Promusicae)	9
Swedish Albums (Sverigetopplistan)	7
Swiss Albums (Schweizer Hitparade)	2
UK Albums (Official Charts)	4
UK Independent Albums (Official Charts)	1
US Billboard 200	108
US Top Rock Albums (Billboard)	12

=== Year-end charts ===
Chart (2019)	Position
Belgian Albums (Ultratop Flanders)	18
Belgian Albums (Ultratop Wallonia)	191
Dutch Albums (Album Top 100)	98
Swiss Albums (Schweizer Hitparade)	98

Chart (2020)	Position
Belgian Albums (Ultratop Flanders)	51

== Certifications ==
Region	Certification	Certified units/sales
Belgium (BRMA)	Gold	10,000^{‡}
United Kingdom (BPI)	Silver	60,000^{‡}
^{‡} Sales+streaming figures based on certification alone.

== Release history ==
Region	Date	Format(s)	Label	Catalogue
Various	4 October 2019	Digital download · streaming	Ghosteen Ltd	BS016DD
Various	8 November 2019	2×CD	Bad Seed Ltd	BS016CD
Various	8 November 2019	2×LP	Bad Seed Ltd	BS016LP
