= This Much I Know to Be True =

- Theatrical release poster
- Directed by: Andrew Dominik
- Produced by: Isaac Hoff; Amy James
- Starring: Nick Cave; Warren Ellis
- Cinematography: Robbie Ryan
- Edited by: Matthew C. Hart
- Music by: Nick Cave; Warren Ellis
- Production companies: Bad Seed Ltd; Uncommon Creative Studio
- Distributed by: Trafalgar Releasing
- Release dates: 12 February 2022 (Berlin); 11 May 2022 (Worldwide)
- Running time: 105 minutes
- Country: United Kingdom
- Language: English
- Box office: $434,251

This Much I Know to Be True is a 2022 British documentary film directed by Andrew Dominik. It is a companion to Dominik's documentary One More Time with Feeling (2016). The film had its world premiere on 12 February 2022 at the 72nd Berlin International Film Festival.

== Synopsis ==
This Much I Know to Be True explores the creative relationship between Australian musicians Nick Cave and Warren Ellis. It features their first performances of songs from their last two studio albums, Ghosteen and Carnage. It was filmed in spring 2021 before their UK tour. Cave and Ellis are accompanied by singers and a string quartet. The film also features an appearance by Cave's longtime friend and collaborator Marianne Faithfull.

The performances are combined with interlude segments exploring the creation and themes of the music. The film also explores of the process of Cave writing The Red Hand Files, a website he uses to respond to questions from fans. It also includes a visit to the workshop of London-based sculptor Corin Johnson, who assists with The Devil – A Life, a series of seventeen Staffordshire stoneware sculptures created by Cave depicting the devil's life.

== Cast ==
- Nick Cave
- Warren Ellis
- Marianne Faithfull
- Earl Cave
- Andrew Dominik
- Wendi Rose
- Janet Ramus
- T Jae Cole
- Eloisa-Fleur Thom
- Alessandro Ruisi
- Luba Tunnicliffe
- Max Ruisi

== Production ==
Dominik was first contacted by Cave while Dominik was finishing work on his film Blonde about the life of Marilyn Monroe. Dominik felt his schedule left him without the time necessary to travel to London and shoot during the COVID-19 pandemic. He initially planned to decline Cave's request, but felt compelled to accept upon relistening to Ghosteen. The film was shot in five days on location in London and Brighton. The performances were shot in Battersea Arts Centre.

== Release ==
The film premiered on 12 February 2022 in the Berlinale Special section at the 72nd Berlin International Film Festival. The film was released worldwide on 11 May 2022 by Trafalgar Releasing in what was dubbed a "global cinema event".

== Reception ==
On Rotten Tomatoes, the film holds an approval rating of 100% based on 39 reviews, with an average rating of 8.0/10. The site's critics consensus reads: "A must-watch for Nick Cave fans, This Much I Know to Be True simply and soberly highlights the redemptive power of music." On Metacritic, it has a weighted average score of 81 out of 100 based on 14 critics, indicating "universal acclaim".

Wendy Ide of Screen International called it "simply executed but undeniably powerful in its lean, stripped back elegance." Jessica Kiang of Variety wrote, "This remarkable performance documentary may be for the Nick Cave-curious exclusively, but for them (us) it is close to essential."
