= Susie Cave =

English fashion designer, entrepreneur, and former model (born 1966)

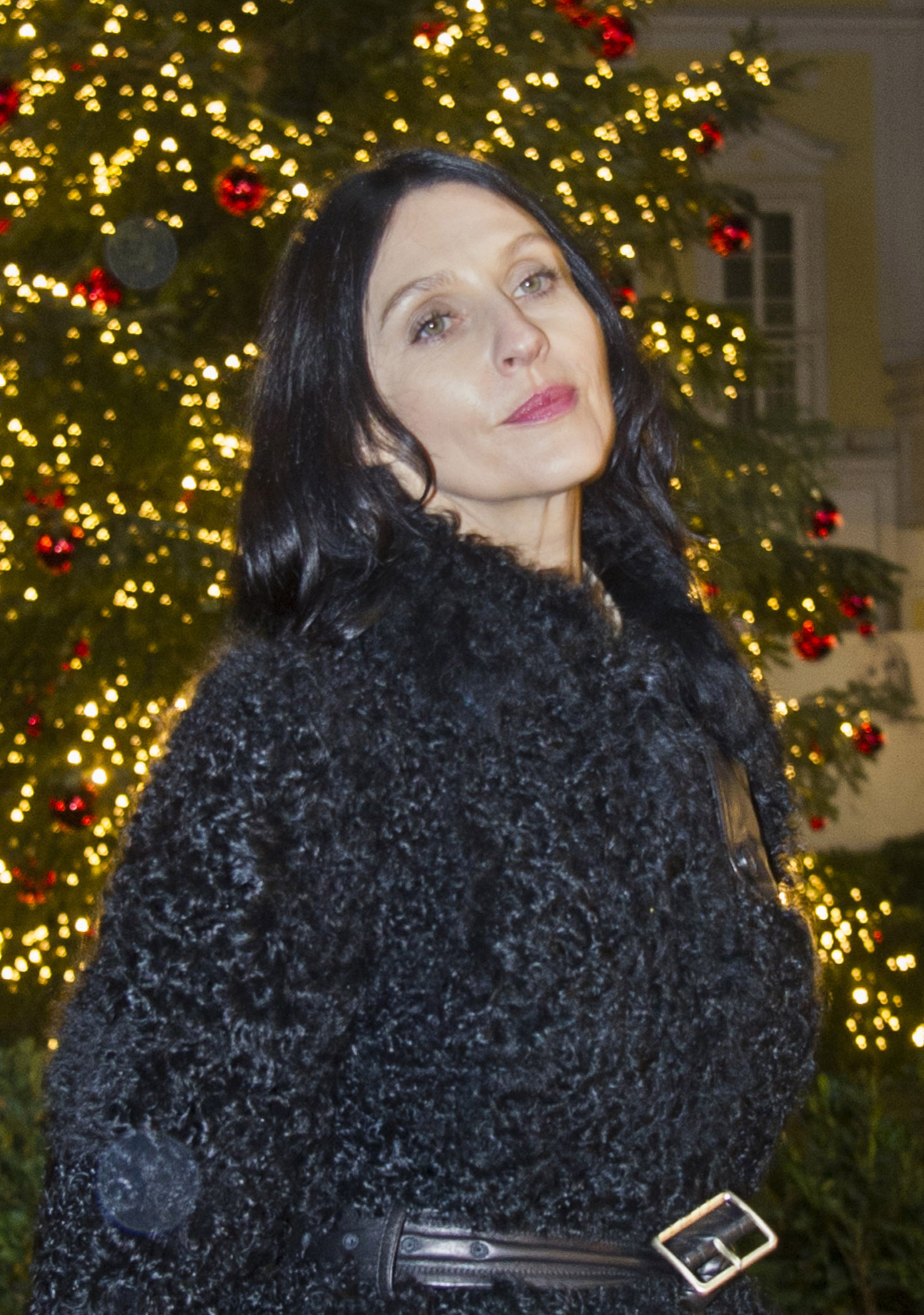
- Cave in November 2013
- Born: 16 September 1966 (age 60); Cheshire, England
- Occupations: Fashion designer; model
- Spouse: Nick Cave (m. 1999)
- Children: 2, including Earl Cave
- Modelling information
- Height: 5 ft 8.5 in (1.74 m)
- Hair colour: Black
- Eye colour: Green
- Agency: Tess Management; Oui Management

Susie Cave (née Bick; born 16 September 1966) is an English fashion designer, entrepreneur, and former model and occasional actress. She co-founded the fashion label The Vampire's Wife.

== Early life ==
Susie Bick was born in Cheshire, England, to a diplomat father. She spent her childhood in Malawi and Nigeria, and ran away from boarding school at age 14.

== Modelling career ==
Bick was discovered by photographer Steven Meisel on a flight to New York at age 14.

She modelled for Yohji Yamamoto, Christian Dior, Nina Ricci, Tuscany perfume, Versace and Yves Saint Laurent. She appeared on the covers of French Glamour, Harper's & Queen, Elle UK, and i-D. She modelled for Vivienne Westwood for ten years.

She was the cover model on the Damned's 1985 album Phantasmagoria, photographed by Bob Carlos Clarke.

Bick gave up her modelling career when she met Nick Cave in 1997.

== The Vampire's Wife ==
In 2014, Cave co-founded the fashion label The Vampire's Wife with Alex Adamson.

Their 'Falconetti' dress was deemed the "dress of the decade" by Vogue. The Vampire's Wife has been described as a "cult favourite" label. Celebrities who have worn the brand include Catherine, Princess of Wales, Princess Beatrice, Princess Sofia, Duchess of Varmland, Kate Moss, Keira Knightley, Florence Welch, Maya Rudolph, Sienna Miller, Ruth Negga, Kirsten Dunst, Alexa Chung, Daisy Lowe, Jenna Coleman, Thandiwe Newton, Zawe Ashton, Rachel Weisz, Margot Robbie, Jennifer Aniston, and Jodie Comer.

In 2024, the brand closed, after the collapse of Matchesfashion, one of their largest stockists.

== Personal life ==
Nicky Clarke and Susie Bick were involved in a well-documented affair in the 1980s. Nicky and his wife Leslie parted after 20 years over his affair.

Bick met Australian musician Nick Cave in 1997; they married in 1999. Their twin sons, Arthur and Earl, were born in London in 2000 and raised in Brighton. She appeared on the cover of Cave's 2013 album Push the Sky Away.

On 14 July 2015, when he was 15 years old, Arthur Cave fell from a cliff at Ovingdean, near Brighton, and died from his injuries at Royal Sussex County Hospital later that day. An inquest found that Arthur had taken LSD before the fall and the coroner ruled his death was an accident. The effect of Arthur's death on the Cave family was explored in the 2016 documentary film One More Time with Feeling.

== Filmography ==
Year	Title	Role	Notes	Director	Ref.
1992	Inferno		TV film	Ellen von Unwerth	
1994	Princess Caraboo		Uncredited	Michael Austin	
1994	Prêt-à-Porter	Susie Bick	Uncredited	Robert Altman	
1995	Flirt	Model		Hal Hartley	
1997	Sex & Chocolate	Catwalk model	TV film	Gavin Millar	
1998	Love Is the Devil: Study for a Portrait of Francis Bacon	Casino	TV film, credited as Suzie Bick	John Maybury	
1999	Mad Cows	Sputnick		Sara Sugarman	
2011	Submission	Black belt	Short film	Martina Amati	
2014	20,000 Days on Earth	Herself	Documentary film	Iain Forsyth and Jane Pollard	
2016	One More Time with Feeling	Herself	Documentary film	Andrew Dominik	
