= Live from KCRW =

Live album by Nick Cave and the Bad Seeds
- Released: 29 November 2013
- Recorded: 18 April 2013
- Studio: Apogee Studio (Santa Monica, California)
- Genre: Rock
- Length: 52:15
- Label: Bad Seed Ltd

Nick Cave and the Bad Seeds chronology
Push the Sky Away (2013)	Live from KCRW (2013)	Skeleton Tree (2016)

Live from KCRW is the fourth live album by the rock band Nick Cave and the Bad Seeds. Released on 29 November 2013 on Bad Seed Ltd, it is a recording of a live radio session done for KCRW on 18 April 2013 at Apogee Studio in Santa Monica, California. The session, which featured a stripped-down line-up performing songs from the band's back catalogue and their most recent release, Push the Sky Away (2013), was recorded by Bob Clearmountain.

Live from KCRW was released on CD and double LP, as well as a digital download. The double LP features two exclusive tracks, "Into My Arms" and "God is in the House", which were excluded from previous radio broadcasts of Nick Cave and the Bad Seeds' KCRW session.

== Reception ==
Professional ratings
Aggregate scores
Source	Rating
Metacritic	77/100
Review scores
Source	Rating
AllMusic	3.5/5 stars
Drowned in Sound	8/10
Exclaim!	8/10
The Irish Times	4/5 stars
The Line of Best Fit	8/10
musicOMH	4/5 stars
The Observer	3/5 stars
Pitchfork	7.8/10
Record Collector	3/5 stars
Uncut	4/5 stars

Upon its release, Live from KCRW received largely positive reviews from music critics. At Metacritic, which assigns a normalised rating out of 100 to reviews from mainstream critics, the album received an average score of 77, based on 14 reviews, indicating "generally favorable reviews". AllMusic reviewer Mark Deming noted that the Bad Seeds were "calling up a palette of sounds that range from the spectral to the majestic, and as they accompany [Nick] Cave on a set of his more contemplative material" and called the material "impressive, especially given the one-take nature of the recording." He rated the album three-and-a-half out of five stars. Writing for Drowned in Sound, Matthew Slaughter described how "Cave the balladeer remains a beast, but a beautiful one … every quiver and every declamation reaches deep inside the ear drum, then rests there." Slaughter added that "it's easy to savour Warren Ellis' tenor guitar scrapes, Jim Sclavunos' simple, effective percussion, Martyn Casey's precise, humming bass and Barry Adamson's ominous organ … as they punctuate the often confused poetry", awarding the album an eight out of ten rating.

In his review for Exclaim!, Vish Khanna said "here [the band] strip down to play mellower fare. That's not to say it's not intense or pensive in its own right; Cave is a master of phrasing and knows how to enhance the suspense and drama in his carefully written lyrics", rating Live from KCRW eight out of ten. Kitty Empire of The Observer wrote that the album "isn't some rip-snorting gallop through perdition, setting Grinch-ish fire to fir trees … it's a classy, dialled-down performance". Awarding the album three out of five stars, Empire selected "Higgs Boson Blues" as Live from KCRW's highlight, referring to it as "a meditation on matters temporal" and "even more spacious here than on [Push the Sky Away]."

A positive review in The Quietus, penned by Julian Marszalek, noted that Live from KCRW "is a fine declaration of where the Bad Seeds are in the here and now … they sound as comfortable in their music as they do the fine suits they wear." Marszalek added that Warren Ellis "has taken the position of Minister of Sinister Noises and his mastery of four-stringed instruments and loops has made an indelible impact on the band", calling his contributions the "breadth of sound that now defines the Bad Seeds." Writing for Pitchfork, Stuart Berman referred to the album as "something of a wild card" among the band's other live albums, further explaining it is "distinguished not just by its loose, casual vibe … but by its welcome variations from the standard Bad Seeds script with a healthy selection of deep cuts that don't get aired out that often."

== Track listing ==
All tracks are written by Nick Cave unless otherwise noted.

CD release
No.	Title	Writer(s)	Length
1.	"Higgs Boson Blues"	Cave, Warren Ellis	8:46
2.	"Far from Me"		5:27
3.	"Stranger Than Kindness"	Anita Lane, Blixa Bargeld	4:53
4.	"The Mercy Seat"	Cave, Mick Harvey	5:11
5.	"And No More Shall We Part"		3:51
6.	"Wide Lovely Eyes"	Cave, Ellis	4:13
7.	"Mermaids"	Cave, Ellis	5:23
8.	"People Ain't No Good"		5:18
9.	"Push the Sky Away"	Cave, Ellis	4:46
10.	"Jack the Ripper"		4:28
Total length:			52:15

Double LP release
No.	Title	Writer(s)	Length
1.	"Higgs Boson Blues"	Cave, Ellis	8:46
2.	"Far from Me"		5:27
3.	"Stranger Than Kindness"	Lane, Bargeld	4:53
4.	"The Mercy Seat"	Cave, Harvey	5:11
5.	"And No More Shall We Part"		3:51
6.	"Wide Lovely Eyes"	Cave, Ellis	4:13
7.	"Mermaids"	Cave, Ellis	5:23
8.	"People Ain't No Good"		5:18
9.	"Into My Arms"		3:48
10.	"God is in the House"		4:26
11.	"Push the Sky Away"	Cave, Ellis	4:46
12.	"Jack the Ripper"		4:28
Total length:			60:29

== Personnel ==
All personnel credits adapted from Live from KCRW's liner notes.

Nick Cave and the Bad Seeds

- Nick Cave – vocals, piano
- Warren Ellis – tenor guitar, violin, piano, loops, backing vocals
- Martyn P. Casey – bass
- Jim Sclavunos – drums, percussion, backing vocals
- Barry Adamson – organ, percussion, backing vocals

Technical personnel

- Bob Clearmountain – recording, mixing
- Brandon Duncan – recording, mixing assistant
- Kevin Paul – additional remixing
- Howie Weinberg – mastering
- Dan Gerbarg – mastering

Design personnel

- Tom Hingston Studio – artwork
- Larry Hirshowitz – photography
- Andrew Whitton – photography

== Charts ==
Chart (2013)	Peak position
Austrian Albums (Ö3 Austria)	24
Belgian Albums Chart (Flanders)	21
Belgian Albums Chart (Wallonia)	65
Danish Albums (Hitlisten)	29
French Albums (SNEP)	107
German Albums Chart	51
Irish Albums Chart	77
Irish Independent Albums Chart	10
Dutch Albums (Album Top 100)	46
Swiss Albums (Schweizer Hitparade)	61
UK Independent Albums Chart	5
US Billboard Independent Albums	41

== Release history ==
Region	Date	Format	Label	Catalog
United States	29 November 2013	2×LP, CD, digital download	Bad Seed Ltd	BS006
Worldwide	2 December 2013	2×LP, CD, digital download	Bad Seed Ltd	BS006
