= Carnage (Nick Cave and Warren Ellis album) =

2021 studio album by Nick Cave and Warren Ellis

Studio album by Nick Cave and Warren Ellis
- Released: 25 February 2021
- Studios: Soundtree, London
- Length: 40:04
- Label: Goliath
- Producers: Nick Cave; Warren Ellis

Nick Cave and Warren Ellis chronology
Kings (Original Motion Picture Soundtrack) (2017)	Carnage (2021)

Carnage is a 2021 studio album by Australian musicians Nick Cave and Warren Ellis. Longtime collaborators in Nick Cave and the Bad Seeds and Grinderman, Carnage is their first full-length studio album as a duo, apart from their extensive work in film music. It was recorded during the COVID-19 lockdown and released digitally on 25 February 2021 via Goliath Records, with a CD and vinyl release on 28 May 2021, but was pushed back to 18 June 2021.

At the 2021 ARIA Music Awards, the album was nominated for Best Adult Contemporary Album.

Songs from Carnage were first performed by Cave and Ellis with singers and a string quartet in the documentary film This Much I Know to Be True, directed by Andrew Dominik and released in 2022. The documentary was filmed in spring 2021 before Cave and Ellis's UK tour.

== Critical reception ==
Professional ratings
Aggregate scores
Source	Rating
AnyDecentMusic?	8.6/10
Metacritic	91/100
Review scores
Source	Rating
AllMusic	4/5 stars
Clash	9/10
The Daily Telegraph	5/5 stars
The Guardian	4/5 stars
The Independent	5/5 stars
NME	5/5 stars
The Observer	5/5 stars
Pitchfork	8.0/10
Rolling Stone	4/5 stars
The Times	4/5 stars

Upon its release, Carnage received widespread acclaim from music critics. At Metacritic, which assigns a normalised rating out of 100 to reviews from professional publications, the release received an average score of 91 (the only album of 2021 to achieve this feat other than American musician Taylor Swift's Red (Taylor's Version)), based on 21 reviews, indicating "universal acclaim". It is Cave's third consecutive studio album to score above 90 on the site. It was ranked the highest-rated album of 2021 by Metacritic, whose list only includes new albums receiving at least 15 reviews from professional critics. As a result, Cave is the only artist to have won Metacritic's Album of the Year three times, following wins for Skeleton Tree (2016) and for Ghosteen (2019).

Reviewing the album for AllMusic, Mark Deming claimed that "There is greater sense of spontaneous energy in Carnage than in much of Cave's music of this period, and that doesn't blunt the craft of this album. It's the work of two collaborative artists who are in the midst of a later-period renaissance that has spawned powerful, evocative music that speaks to its time without being confined to the crises that sparked its creation." Robin Murray also gave the album a positive assessment in a review for Clash, declaring that it "stands as something unique, the sound of two vastly experienced musicians removing themselves from expectations, and constructing something both beautiful and visceral, tender and blood-thirsty, wholly terrifying and completely absorbing." At The Daily Telegraph, Neil McCormick described the mood of the album as being "infused with profound and almost inescapable grief. But as this particularly audacious singer-songwriter grapples with isolation, loneliness, loss and the hard emotional graft of endurance, all set against a backdrop of apocalyptic threat, the personal becomes universal. Carnage may just be the greatest lockdown album yet."

Writing for The Guardian, Alexis Petridis compared it to Cave's previous album; "If it doesn’t feel quite as remarkable as Ghosteen, that tells you more about the previous album than the quality of Carnage: Cave and Ellis’s musical approach is still vividly alive, the dense, constantly shifting sound complementing the richness of Cave’s writing now." Helen Brown was less critical in the review for The Independent, stating that "Although the sonic mood mellows after the first two tracks, listeners will be invited to share the transcendent joy in memories of a lost child; the awe of an uxorious lover whose prayer-like love for his wife is a continual saving grace; and the frustration of a caged man with an “open road” of a heart." Andrew Trendell of NME gave the album a perfect score, writing, "Carnage is arguably Cave and Ellis' best record since The Bad Seeds' latter day reinvention on 2013's Push the Sky Away, or maybe even Abattoir Blues. It's certainly two master craftsmen at the peak of their melodramatic powers." Martin Boulton of The Sydney Morning Herald praised the album's "vast, cinematic quality" and Cave's lyricism. In Hot Press Pat Carty concluded that "Carnage is a phenomenal piece of art, where these two giants, these wizards of Aus and old and odd, surpass themselves, again."

=== Year-end lists ===
Carnage on year-end lists
Publication	List	Rank	Ref.
The Guardian	The 50 best albums of 2021	15	
Mojo	The 75 Best Albums of 2021	5	
Paste	The 50 Best Albums of 2021	13	
The Sunday Times	25 best albums of 2021	5	
The Telegraph	The 10 best albums of 2021	3	
Uncut	The Top 75 Albums of the Year	3	

== Track listing ==
All lyrics are written by Nick Cave; all music is composed by Nick Cave and Warren Ellis.

Track listing
No.	Title	Length
1.	"Hand of God"	5:17
2.	"Old Time"	5:16
3.	"Carnage"	4:47
4.	"White Elephant"	6:08
5.	"Albuquerque"	3:57
6.	"Lavender Fields"	4:34
7.	"Shattered Ground"	5:35
8.	"Balcony Man"	4:30
Total length:		40:04

== Personnel ==
Credits adapted from the album's liner notes and Tidal.

- Nick Cave – vocals, background vocals, percussion, piano, synthesizer, arrangements, production, mixing, sleeve design
- Warren Ellis – background vocals, autoharp, drum machine, alto flute, glockenspiel, tenor guitar, harmonium, loops, piano, synthesizer, viola, violin, arrangements, production, mixing
- Strings (tracks 1–6, 8)
  - Eloisa-Fleur Thom – violin
  - Alessandro Ruisi – violin
  - Luba Tunnicliffe – viola
  - Max Ruisi – cello
- Choir (tracks 1, 3, 5, 8)
  - Hannah Cooke
  - Nicholas Madden
  - Amy Carson
  - Timothy Dickinson
  - Sarah Dacey
- Esmeralda Conde Ruiz – choir conductor
- Thomas Wydler – drums (track 2)
- Matt Colton – mastering
- Luis Almau – drums (track 4), acoustic guitar (track 4), arrangements, mixing, engineering
- Ben Jones – assistance
- Ramera Abraham – assistance
- Colin McIlhagga – assistance
- Hingston Studio – sleeve design

== Charts ==
=== Weekly charts ===
Weekly chart performance for Carnage
Chart (2021)	Peak position
Australian Albums (ARIA)	2
Austrian Albums (Ö3 Austria)	4
Belgian Albums (Ultratop Flanders)	3
Belgian Albums (Ultratop Wallonia)	4
Czech Albums (ČNS IFPI)	19
Danish Albums (Hitlisten)	15
Dutch Albums (Album Top 100)	3
Finnish Albums (Suomen virallinen lista)	39
German Albums (Offizielle Top 100)	5
Irish Albums (Official Charts)	15
Italian Albums (FIMI)	32
New Zealand Albums (RMNZ)	25
Norwegian Albums (VG-lista)	6
Polish Albums (ZPAV)	30
Portuguese Albums (AFP)	1
Scottish Albums (Official Charts)	1
Spanish Albums (Promusicae)	17
Swedish Albums (Sverigetopplistan)	17
Swiss Albums (Schweizer Hitparade)	4
UK Albums (Official Charts)	3
UK Independent Albums (Official Charts)	2
US Top Album Sales (Billboard)	29

=== Year-end charts ===
Year-end chart performance for Carnage
Chart (2021)	Position
Belgian Albums (Ultratop Flanders)	69
