= Carly Paradis =

Canadian–British musician and composer

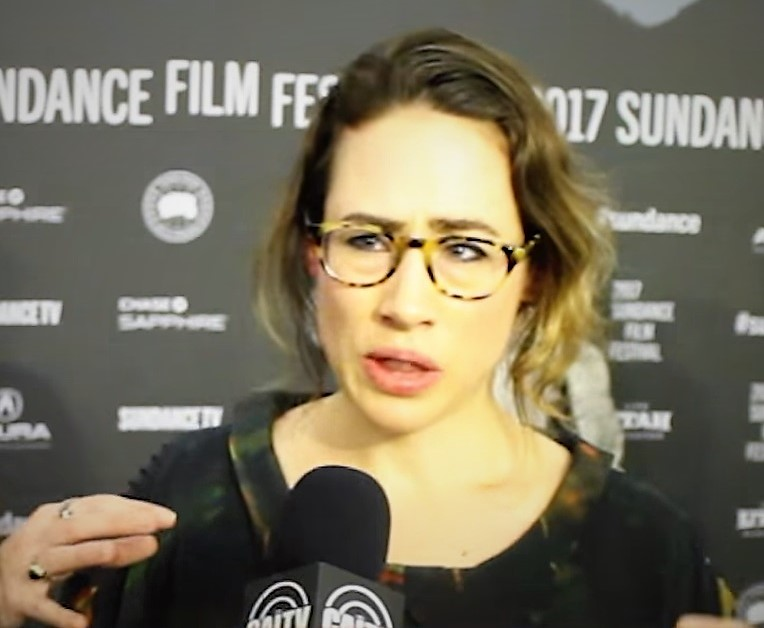
- Paradis in 2017

Background information
- Born: Hamilton, Ontario, Canada
- Origin: Stoney Creek Ontario, Canada
- Genres: Contemporary classical; indie; instrumental; electronic; Chamber Pop; alternative
- Occupations: Musician; composer
- Instrument: Piano
- Spouse: Colin Murray (m. 2012; sep. 2022)
- Website: carlyparadis.com

Carly Paradis is a Canadian-British composer, songwriter, and pianist. She composes soundtracks for movies, TV series and solo albums.

In 2007, she worked with film composer Clint Mansell arranging piano parts on Mansell's soundtrack for the film Moon directed by Duncan Jones, and played all piano on the official score and soundtrack. As of 2022, Paradis has been playing keyboards for Nick Cave and the Bad Seeds.

== Career ==
=== Background ===
Paradis was born in Hamilton, Ontario and raised in nearby Stoney Creek. She was formerly in a Canadian pop/rock duo called Oceanship. The group released one self-titled album.

=== Film and television scoring ===
She worked alongside Clint Mansell, arranging piano in the 2009 feature film The Rebound starring Catherine Zeta-Jones. She composed the score to the 2010 Steven Seagal film Deadly Crossing and his 2011–2012 television series True Justice. In 2010 she composed the score to the BBC Two documentary Davis v Taylor: The '85 Black Ball Final, commemorating the 25th anniversary of the 1985 World Snooker Championship final which was hosted by her husband Colin Murray.

She composed the theme to BBC's drama Line of Duty, the ITV prequel series Prime Suspect 1973, the Sky One comedy Sick Note, and the Acorn TV drama series Whitstable Pearl. She also composed a segment of the first female driven horror anthology XX which premiered at Sundance Film Festival 2017. Paradis scored The Innocents in 2018 on Netflix.

=== Performance ===
Paradis has performed piano and keyboard alongside noted film composer Clint Mansell and Sonus Quartet showcasing his works at the Gent Film Festival in Belgium, Tenerife International Film Festival in the Canary Islands, Union Chapel, Islington, Le Trianon (theatre) Paris, Barbican Centre London, Royal Festival Hall London, Royal Northern College of Music Manchester, National Concert Hall Dublin and Melbourne Recital Centre as part of the Melbourne Festival. Paradis performed her Netflix original series suite and theme song to The Innocents at the BBC Proms 2019 Royal Albert Hall conducted by Robert Ames and performed by London Contemporary Orchestra.

In 2022, Paradis became a touring member of Nick Cave and the Bad Seeds, playing keyboards during their live performances. She contributed whistling to the song "O Wow O Wow (How Wonderful She Is)" on the band's 2024 studio album, Wild God, stating: "I can whistle pretty good and I do bird calls. I'm from Canada, when I'm up North at my cottage, there's a certain bird I can call, a warbler, and it'll fly to me." According to Cave, when his manager gave him a list of potential keyboardists, "[a]t the end of the list was a woman named Carly Paradis, but her résumé said she basically worked on TV scores. Not very promising, I thought, until I noticed she had written the theme music for the English cop show, Line of Duty, which is awesome. I rang her straight away and asked if she wanted to join The Bad Seeds. She did, and that was that."

== Albums ==
In April 2011, the mini-album They Have Been Watching was released on iTunes.

In November 2013, the debut album Hearts to Symphony was released on iTunes and green vinyl.

In 2014, the official Line of Duty TV series soundtrack was released on iTunes.

In November 2019, the album Nothing Is Something was released digitally and on cream-colored vinyl.

In March 2022, the TV soundtrack album The Rising was released on Lakeshore Records.

In November 2024, the TV soundtrack album Until I Kill You was released.

In March 2025, the TV series theme song from Get Millie Black was released in collaboration with Jamaican collective Equiknoxx.

== Awards and nominations ==
BAFTA 2022 TV Craft nomination for Original Music Line of Duty Series 6. Winner of Royal Television Society and the Music + Sound Award for best titles music The Rising (TV series) 2022. Royal Television Society for best title music The Pembrokeshire Murders and NI original music score for Line of Duty series 4 nomination. Won a Hollywood Music in Media Award (HMMA) for original song in Netflix Original The Innocents. She won silver Promax Awards for her The Story of God with Morgan Freeman trailer music. Underwire Film Festival nomination for best score for short film Trial written and directed by The Brothers Lynch. Paradis was nominated for Piano / Keyboard Player of the Year in the Hamilton Music Awards 2009.

On Thursday 23 May 2024, her soundtrack to Typist Artist Pirate King was nominated for the Best Original Film Score Ivor Novello Award.
