= Else Torp =

Danish soprano (born 1968)

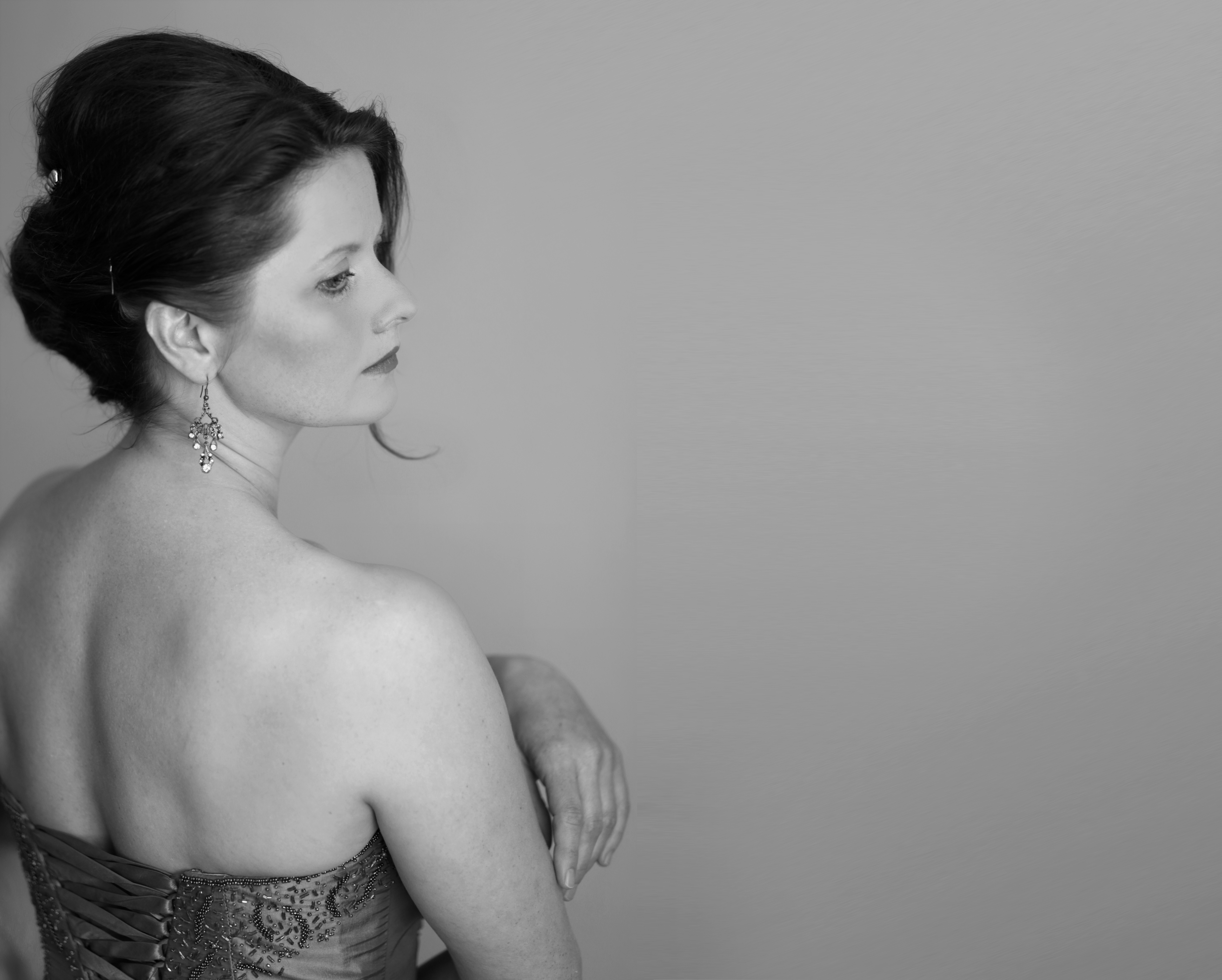
Else Torp

Else Torp is a Danish soprano born 1968 in Roskilde.

== Career ==
She is a member of Paul Hillier's Theatre of Voices, with whom she sings ancient and baroque works of composers such as Peter Abelard, Roland de Lassus, Thomas Tallis, and Heinrich Schütz, as well as contemporary creations such as by John Cage, Karlheinz Stockhausen, and Arvo Pärt. She has also collaborated with renowned ensembles such as Concerto Copenhagen, the Lautten Compagney Berlin and the Kronos Quartet.

Torp first specialized in baroque and even earlier music, but is also recognized as an exponent of many kinds of new music. She has been featured with orchestras as the Scottish Chamber Orchestra, Gulbenkian Orchestra, Lautten Compagney Berlin and on recordings with ensembles such as Theatre of Voices, London Sinfonietta, Smith Quartet and the Kronos Quartet. After a recent concert and CD project, David Harrington wrote: "As a violinist I judge the quality of my high notes by those I've heard Else Torp sing. What an inspiration."

Torp also sings an extensive repertoire of German and Danish Lieder, and presents exotic works such as William Walton's Façade and Judith Weir's one-voice opera King Harald's Saga. Her Harmonia Mundi recording of Pärt's "My Heart's in the Highlands" with organist Christopher Bowers-Broadbent is featured on the soundtrack of Paolo Sorrentino's Oscar-winning film The Great Beauty, and was chosen by Nick Cave to be featured on a promotion CD in the February 2014 issue of Mojo. She also sang on "Distant Sky", from Cave's 2016 album Skeleton Tree.
