= We No Who U R =

Single by Nick Cave and the Bad Seeds

from the album Push the Sky Away
- Released: 3 December 2012
- Recorded: 2011–2012 at La Fabrique in Saint-Rémy-de-Provence, France
- Genre: Alternative rock, electronic
- Length: 4:04
- Label: Bad Seed Ltd.
- Songwriter(s): Nick Cave and Warren Ellis
- Producer(s): Nick Launay

Nick Cave and the Bad Seeds singles chronology
"Midnight Man" (2008)	"We No Who U R" (2012)	"Jubilee Street" (2013)

"We No Who U R" is a song by the Australian alternative rock band Nick Cave and the Bad Seeds. Produced by Nick Launay, it is the opening track and lead single from the band's fifteenth studio album Push the Sky Away, and was released on 3 December 2012 on Bad Seed Ltd.—the band's own record label.

== Release and reception ==
"We No Who U R" was announced for release in an official press release for Push the Sky Away. The song was uploaded to SoundCloud on 27 November 2012 and made available for private stream. The single version was later released as a digital download on 3 December and issued as a free download with pre-orders of the album.

Critical reception to the song was largely positive. The Quietus said that "anyone expecting a Lazarus or Grinderman–style sleaze rock meltdown, you'll be in for a surprise—it's among the most low-key and contemplative music we've heard from Messrs Cave and co for quite some time." Rolling Stone described the single as "an eerily restrained ballad with an undercurrent of menace in its refrain" and writing for Spin, Marc Hogan stated "the erstwhile Grinderman frontman intones somberly, backed by an uncrowded yet ornate arrangement of whispery vocal harmonies, spidery electric guitar trills, and stark flute tones." Digital Spy reviewer Mayer Nissim said "sounding like something Leonard Cohen never quite got round to sticking on Ten New Songs, 'We No Who U R' is perhaps the most tender song Cave has recorded since No More Shall We Part" and referred to the song as "an ethereal poem where nature—not God—grants salvation."

== Music video ==
A music video, featuring the official lyrics of "We No Who U R", was posted on YouTube on 2 December 2012. An official music video was directed by Gaspar Noé and released on 4 January 2013. The video, recorded in one take, "tracks the silhouette of a human form through a wood at night." Nick Cave referred to the music video as "beautiful, haunting and thoughtful."

== Chart positions ==
Chart (2012)	Peak position
Belgium (Bubbling Under Ultratip Flanders)	22
Netherlands (Single Top 100)	69
