= One More Time with Feeling =

- Theatrical-release poster
- Directed by: Andrew Dominik
- Produced by: Dulcie Kellett; James Wilson
- Starring: Nick Cave; Warren Ellis; Susie Bick
- Cinematography: Benoît Debie; Alwin H. Küchler
- Edited by: Shane Reid
- Music by: Nick Cave and the Bad Seeds
- Production companies: Iconoclast; JW Films; Pulse Films
- Distributed by: Trafalgar Releasing
- Release dates: 5 September 2016 (Venice Film Festival); 8 September 2016 (Worldwide)
- Running time: 113 minutes
- Country: United Kingdom
- Language: English
- Box office: $1.7 million

One More Time with Feeling is a 2016 British documentary film directed by Andrew Dominik. It documents the recording of Nick Cave and the Bad Seeds' sixteenth studio album, Skeleton Tree, in the aftermath of the death of Nick Cave's 15-year-old son Arthur.

== Background ==
Nick Cave's 15-year-old son Arthur died after an accidental cliff fall at the Ovingdean Gap in Brighton, England in July 2015. At the time of Arthur's death, Cave was partway through recording sessions for Skeleton Tree, the sixteenth studio album by Nick Cave and the Bad Seeds.

== Synopsis ==
One More Time with Feeling documents the final production process of Skeleton Tree, in the aftermath of the death of Nick Cave's son Arthur. The film includes 35 minutes of Nick Cave and the Bad Seeds performing at Air Studios in London in early 2016 during the final recording sessions for the album, as well as director Andrew Dominik's interviews with Cave, band member Warren Ellis and Cave's wife Susie Bick. The film also features "intermittent narration and improvised rumination" from Cave throughout.

== Production ==
Principal production for One More Time with Feeling started in February 2016 and the entire film was shot over the course of 10 days with a crew of seven people. The film was shot in both black and white and in color and in both 2D and 3D, with two specialist 3D technicians. Dominik originally intended to shoot the film as "a performance based concept", but it became "something much more significant" as he began conducting interviews during filming. The decision to conduct interviews and introduce non-musical elements was "completely improvised" by Dominik during principal production. Interviews with Nick Cave and Susie Bick were filmed in both London and Brighton.

Dominik and Cave had an agreement where Dominik could film at any time and ask Cave any question, provided that "if there was anything [Cave] didn't like he could cut it out". Several "emotional" scenes of the film were edited out due to Dominik's "confusion [on] how to deal with the subject" and for fear that they were "exploitative in some way". The portions of the film featuring Cave's narration and voiceovers were recorded on his iPhone after filming was completed. Several hours of his personal recordings were sent to Dominik via Dropbox; Dominik edited the recordings and "built sequences around pieces" of them.

Cave both commissioned and financed One More Time with Feeling himself in order to avoid conducting interviews about Skeleton Tree and his son's death with the media. According to Dominik, Cave was not expecting to profit from the film's release and "his best hope [was] to break even."

The film's title was lifted from the lyrics of Magneto, a song from Skeleton Tree.

== Release ==
One More Time with Feeling premiered at the Venice Film Festival in Venice, Italy on 5 September 2016. It received a general worldwide release in 850 theatres on 8 September, the day before Nick Cave and the Bad Seeds released Skeleton Tree. Originally intended to be a one-night-only event, additional screenings were added until 11 September due to demand in certain locations.

A trailer for both the film and the album was released on 2 August, a month prior to its release.

=== Critical response ===
One More Time with Feeling received widespread critical acclaim. On review aggregator website Rotten Tomatoes, the film has an approval rating of 100%, based on 26 reviews, with an average rating of 9.0/10. At Metacritic, which assigns a normalised rating out of 100 to reviews from mainstream critics, the film received an average score of 92, based on 14 reviews, indicating "universal acclaim".

=== Box office ===
Following its initial release on 8 September 2016 and the additional screenings added over the next four days due to demand in certain locations, One More Time with Feeling grossed £343,000 at the United Kingdom box office and $1.7 million worldwide.
