= Jubilee Street (song) =

Single by Nick Cave and the Bad Seeds

from the album Push the Sky Away
- Released: 15 January 2013
- Recorded: December 2011–August 2012 at La Fabrique in Saint-Rémy-de-Provence, France
- Genre: Alternative rock, blues rock
- Length: 6:35
- Label: Bad Seed Ltd.
- Songwriters: Nick Cave, Warren Ellis
- Producer: Nick Launay

Nick Cave and the Bad Seeds singles chronology
"We No Who U R" (2012)	"Jubilee Street" (2013)	"Mermaids" (2013)

"Jubilee Street" is a song by the Australian alternative rock band Nick Cave and the Bad Seeds. It is the fourth track and second single from the band's fifteenth studio album, Push the Sky Away, and was released on 15 January 2013 on Bad Seed Ltd.

An accompanying music video directed by John Hillcoat and featuring an appearance by Ray Winstone, was released on 4 February 2013. It was nominated for Best Video at the ARIA Music Awards of 2013.

== Background ==
"Jubilee Street" was written about a prostitute from the point of view of her customer, who later murders her after impregnating her. The album Push the Sky Away contains the song "Finishing Jubilee Street" later in the track list, about a dream Cave had after he finished writing "Jubilee Street". At Cave's Brighton concert in Preston Park in July 2026, he confirmed that the song is set on Jubilee Street in Brighton, “near the giant Five Guys hamburger joint they’ve erected, to immortalise this song."

== Music video ==
The music video was directed by John Hillcoat and stars English actor Ray Winstone with an unnamed woman. The video features graphic nudity and includes scenes of Winstone caressing her feet. It premiered exclusively on Noisey on 4 February 2013.

== Track listing ==
Digital download

1. "Jubilee Street" (Cave, Ellis) – 6:35

== Charts ==
Chart (2013)	Peak position
Belgium (Ultratip Bubbling Under Flanders)	68

Chart (2026)	Peak position
UK Singles Sales (Official Charts)	5
