= Skeleton Tree =

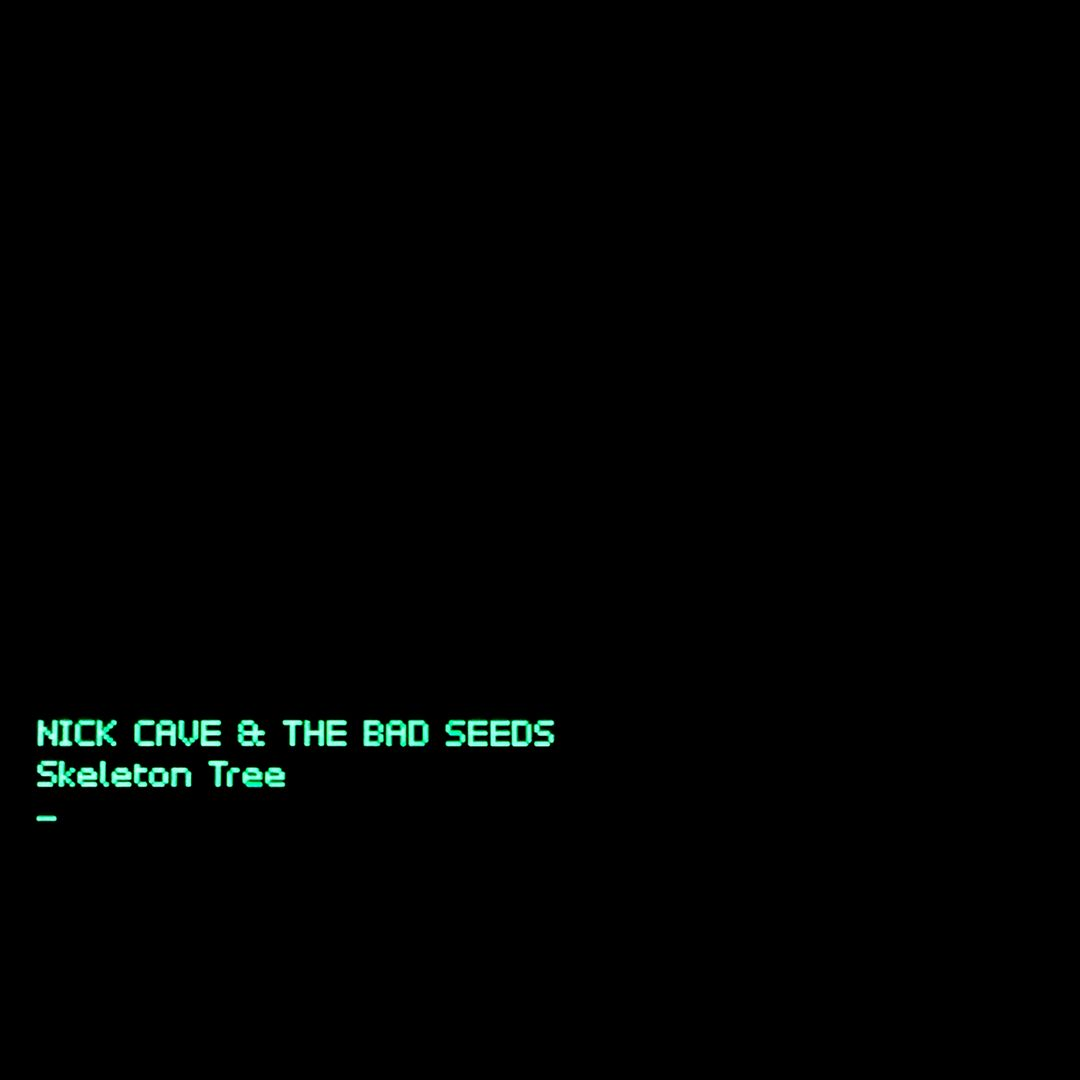

Studio album by Nick Cave and the Bad Seeds
- Released: 9 September 2016
- Recorded: 2014–2016
- Studios: Retreat (Brighton, England); La Frette (La Frette-sur-Seine, France) (Note: Additional overdubs recorded at AIR in London, England)
- Genres: Avant-garde; ambient; electronica
- Length: 39:42
- Label: Bad Seed Ltd.
- Producers: Nick Cave; Warren Ellis (Note: Additional production by Nick Launay)

Nick Cave and the Bad Seeds chronology
Live from KCRW (2013)	Skeleton Tree (2016)	Lovely Creatures: The Best of Nick Cave and the Bad Seeds (2017)

Singles from Skeleton Tree
- 1. "Jesus Alone" Released: 2 September 2016; 2. "Skeleton Tree" Released: 25 November 2016; 3. "I Need You" Released: February 2017; 4. "Rings of Saturn" Released: 2017

Skeleton Tree is the sixteenth studio album by Australian rock band Nick Cave and the Bad Seeds. It was released on 9 September 2016 on Bad Seed Ltd. A follow-up to the band's critically acclaimed album Push the Sky Away (2013), Skeleton Tree was recorded over 18 months at Retreat Recording Studios in Brighton, La Frette Studios in La Frette-sur-Seine and Air Studios in London. It was produced by Nick Cave, Warren Ellis and Nick Launay. During the sessions, Cave's 15-year-old son, Arthur, died from an accidental fall. Most of the album had been written at the time of Cave's son's death, but several lyrics were amended by Cave during subsequent recording sessions and feature themes of death, loss, and personal grief.

Skeleton Tree's minimal production and "less polished" sound incorporates elements of electronica and ambient music and, like Push the Sky Away, features extensive use of synthesizers, drum machines and loops. Several songs on the album utilise avant-garde techniques, including the use of dissonant musical elements and non-standard song structures. Cave's allegorical and often improvised lyrics have also been noted to be less narrative- and character-based than on previous Bad Seeds albums.

One More Time with Feeling, a documentary film about the aftermath of Cave's son's death and the recording process of Skeleton Tree, accompanied the album's release. Directed by Andrew Dominik, the film received a limited release and was conceived by Cave to explain the context and themes of Skeleton Tree without conducting interviews with the media. Both the film and the album received widespread critical acclaim. It was the second of only two albums by the band to enter the U.S. Top 30, reaching 27, their highest ranking there to date.

== Recording ==
Skeleton Tree was recorded over several sessions from late 2014 to early 2016, with Nick Cave and Warren Ellis producing the album; Cave financed the recording sessions himself. Initial recording began at Retreat Recording Studios in Brighton, England, in late 2014, with Kevin Paul as the main recording engineer.

On July 15, 2015, near the end of the sessions, Cave's 15-year-old son Arthur died after falling from the nearby Ovingdean Gap. Cave and Ellis returned to the studio two weeks later to review the material recorded for Skeleton Tree. Most of the basic tracks for each song and a majority of Cave's vocals were completed by this time. The album's sessions then resumed at La Frette Studios in La Frette-sur-Seine, France, in autumn 2015, with Nick Launay engineering and co-producing the sessions. Final overdubs for Skeleton Tree were recorded at Air Studios in London, with engineers Kevin Paul and Jake Jackson, in early 2016. Several performances from the final recording sessions were shot for the album's accompanying documentary film One More Time with Feeling, directed by Andrew Dominik.

Regarding Cave's decision to return to the studio following Arthur's death, Warren Ellis later noted: "Nick was adamant that we went in there. He said, 'I don't know how to navigate this but I know work is the only thing in the past that's got me through things.' But nobody knew what that meant. It was still very fresh and raw." Percussionist Jim Sclavunos elaborated: "Being so soon after the tragic circumstances, it felt right to preserve this uneasy, ineffable quality."

== Composition ==
Several publications have noted Skeleton Tree's lyrical themes of loss and death, particularly in relation to the death of Cave's son Arthur. The majority of the songs on the album were written prior to Arthur's death. However, some lyrics—such as the opening lines to "Jesus Alone"—have been regarded as "prophetic" in the wake of his death. Several lyrics were "semi-improvised" in subsequent recording sessions as Cave had expressed a desire to move on from "narrative-based songs", claiming he had "lost faith" in them.

Skeleton Tree's lyrics are noted as being often allegorical and "never directly [address]" the event of Arthur's death. Esquire observed how the album's lyrics are "less explicitly about Arthur's death and more about the ripple effects of that sort of catastrophe" on Cave and his family, "and the way everyone else finds their way back"; Billboard described the album's lyrics as "freeform elegies … tapping into the unconscious." Consequence of Sound detailed the "radical shift" in Cave's lyrics on Skeleton Tree, noting that they "[are] no longer telling elaborate stories full of intricately felt characters" like the Bad Seeds' previous material and that Cave had "unlock[ed] a more primal type of storytelling, something even more raw, deep, and dark". Cave commissioned Andrew Dominik to direct One More Time with Feeling—in which Cave discusses the album's writing and recording process after Arthur's death—so that he could address the album's context without conducting interviews with the media.

Skeleton Tree's sound has been observed as "far more stripped-down" than the Bad Seeds' earlier albums and features "less polished" production. The album features components of multiple genres and has been described generally as an avant-garde album. Several songs contain dissonant musical elements—including the use of unresolved chords, drones, atonality, noise, and vocal melodies which do not conform to the songs' time signatures. Additionally, most of the songs' structures do not follow the standard verse-chorus-verse form. Skeleton Tree has been also described as featuring elements of electronica—including use of synthesizers, drum machines and shuffled beats. The album's "sparse and restrained" arrangements, as well as its use of loops and downtempo rhythms, have been cited by several critics as reminiscent of ambient music.

== Packaging ==
Skeleton Tree's sleeve design was created by the Hingston Studio, an independent creative agency based in London; Tom Hingston, the agency's creative director, had previously designed the sleeve and cover art for Push the Sky Away. The front-cover artwork features a solid black background, with the band name and album title in monospace-style green font in the bottom-left centre. Skeleton Tree's interior liner notes, as well as the text on the discs, are presented in the same typeface. A black-and-white photograph of Cave from the album's recording sessions, depicting him writing in a notebook while seated at a grand piano, is featured in the booklet; it was shot by German cinematographer and photographer Alwin Küchler.

Several publications have commented on the minimalist design of Skeleton Tree, regarding it as a visual equivalent to the album's themes. Néoprisme, a French design magazine, described the choice use of black as "the colour of eternal mourning" and reminiscent of how the album was "stained black due to the circumstance." Paste referred to Skeleton Tree's cover art as "stark" and "up front … leaving little to the imagination" and said it symbolised Cave "mak[ing] it plain to listeners that he's still mourning".

== Release ==
Skeleton Tree was released worldwide on 9 September 2016 on Bad Seed Ltd, under licence to Kobalt Label Services. It was issued on CD, LP and across all digital streaming and download platforms. The album was announced three months before its release, and a one-and-a-half-minute trailer for both Skeleton Tree and Andrew Dominik's documentary film One More Time with Feeling was released in August. The album's track listing was confirmed two weeks later.

A week prior to Skeleton Tree's release the opening track from the album, "Jesus Alone", was released as a single. A music video directed by Dominik accompanied the release and featured footage from One More Time with Feeling. A second video from One More Time with Feeling, featuring the Nick Cave and the Bad Seeds performing "I Need You", was released a week later.

One More Time with Feeling—featuring in-studio performances by the band and "accompanied by Cave's intermittent narration and improvised rumination"—was shot in both black and white and colour and in both 2D and 3D. The film was released in cinemas worldwide on 8 September, the day before Skeleton Tree's official release. Originally a one-night-only event, additional screenings were added until 11 September due to demand in certain locations. Critical response to One More Time with Feeling was unanimously positive.

=== Commercial performance ===
On the United Kingdom's mid-week albums chart Skeleton Tree debuted at number 2, selling 17,600 copies in its first three days of release.

Skeleton Tree debuted at number one on the Australian Albums Chart as well as on several international albums charts, including the Belgian Albums Chart in Wallonia, the Danish Albums Chart, the Finnish Albums Chart, the Irish Albums Chart, the Irish Independent Albums Chart, the New Zealand Albums Chart, and the Norwegian Albums Chart.

Skeleton Tree became Nick Cave's highest charting album in the United States, debuting at number twenty-seven on the Billboard 200.

== Reception ==
=== Critical response ===
Professional ratings
Aggregate scores
Source	Rating
AnyDecentMusic?	8.9/10
Metacritic	95/100
Review scores
Source	Rating
AllMusic	5/5 stars
Chicago Tribune	3.5/4 stars
The Daily Telegraph	5/5 stars
The Guardian	5/5 stars
The Independent	5/5 stars
NME	5/5
The Observer	4/5 stars
Pitchfork	9.0/10
Q	5/5 stars
Rolling Stone	4/5 stars

Upon its release Skeleton Tree received rave reviews from music critics and audiences. At Metacritic, which assigns a normalised rating out of 100 to reviews from mainstream critics, the album received an average score of 95, based on 34 reviews, indicating "universal acclaim". In a five-out-of-five-star review for the London Evening Standard, John Aizlewood called Skeleton Tree a "breathtakingly beautiful, grief-strewn record, sometimes direct, sometimes allegorical" and praised both the album's "tender and restrained" music and Cave's "more broken and more uncertain" vocals; Aizlewood said that Skeleton Tree was a "staggering achievement, the one for which Nick Cave will always be remembered." An early first-listen review in the Guardian referred to the album as "unsurprisingly, a very dark record", but said "there is also beauty, empathy and love as it veers between bewildered numbness and heartbreaking profundity". The Guardian's Dave Simpson likened Cave's "instinctive howl from the heart and gut" to Johnny Cash's cover version of Nine Inch Nails' "Hurt", saying "the frailties, wounds and vulnerabilities in his voice give the record its strength and humanity" and summarising it as "a masterpiece of love and devastation".

In a first listen review, Jess Denham of The Independent wrote that Cave's "experience of bereavement is blisteringly undiluted" and called Skeleton Tree "a beautiful, shatteringly visceral portrait of grief". Writing for Rolling Stone, reviewer Kory Grow referred to Cave as "the dean of literary gothic song-craft, a master of wordplay, symbolism and irony" and described how on Skeleton Tree Cave was "baring his soul like never before", adding that the album "resonates with raw, emotional intensity in a stunning way". NME reviewer Barry Nicolson called it a "masterpiece" and "both beautiful and harrowing, hard to listen to but even harder to look away from." In a review for AllMusic, Mark Deming was more reserved in his praise, noting that "the music lacks the dramatic, grand-scale arrangements of Cave's albums of the 21st century" and that "the final effect feels more like an author reading over ambient backing tracks than the sort of evocative sounds one might expect" from the band, but nonetheless concluding that although Skeleton Tree is a "tough listen … it's also a powerful and revealing one, and a singular work from a one-of-a-kind artist."

Slant Magazine writer Jeremy Winograd called Skeleton Tree "Cave's darkest, most emotionally devastating work to date" and said that although it "may not be Cave's most accessible album, owing both to the experimental nature of much of the music and the fact that its level of emotional rawness makes it a legitimately uncomfortable listen in places, it may very well be his best"; Wingrod rated the album four-and-a-half-out-of-five stars. Clash gave Skeleton Tree a nine-out-of-ten rating, with reviewer Josh Gray praising Cave and Ellis' songwriting and arrangements and summarising the album as "a stark, beautiful rendering of deep, profound pain." Paula Mejia wrote in Paste that "Skeleton Tree strips down embellishments and brings to the forefront sinister bass lines and a synthesizer that will widen the tear in your heart a little more with every note"; Mejia concluded that "there's something to be said about Skeleton Tree and its starkness, which is as familiar as life and death, an elegy, and a hell of a thing to forget", rating the album nine out of ten. Pitchfork also gave the album a nine-out-of-ten rating and selected it as the week's "Best New Music"; "I Need You" was also selected as the week's "Best New Track" and was described as "the stirring core of the Bad Seeds' devastating new album."

=== Accolades ===
Publication	Accolade	Rank	Ref.
Flood Magazine	The Best Records of 2016	1	
Mojo	The 50 Best Albums of 2016	3	
NME	NME's Albums of the Year 2016	24	
Paste	The 50 Best Albums of 2016	23	
Pitchfork	The 50 Best Albums of 2016	15	
Pitchfork	The 20 Best Rock Albums of 2016	—N/a	
PopMatters	The 70 Best Albums of 2016	23	
Rolling Stone	50 Best Albums of 2016	20	
Rough Trade	Albums of the Year	11	
The Skinny	Top 50 Albums of 2016	6	
Stereogum	The 50 Best Albums of 2016	23	
Uncut	Top 75 Best Albums of 2016	3	
The Wire	Top 50 Releases of 2016	5	

== Track listing ==
All lyrics are written by Nick Cave; all music is composed by Cave and Warren Ellis.

No.	Title	Length
1.	"Jesus Alone"	5:52
2.	"Rings of Saturn"	3:28
3.	"Girl in Amber"	4:51
4.	"Magneto"	5:22
5.	"Anthrocene"	4:34
6.	"I Need You"	5:58
7.	"Distant Sky"	5:36
8.	"Skeleton Tree"	4:01
Total length:		39:42

== Personnel ==
All personnel credits adapted from Skeleton Tree's album notes.

Nick Cave and the Bad Seeds

- Nick Cave – vocals, piano, Wurlitzer, synthesizer, vibraphone, backing vocals
- Warren Ellis – synthesizer, loops, Wurlitzer, piano, baritone tenor guitar, violin, viola, drum treatments, drum loops, backing vocals
- Martyn Casey – bass
- Thomas Wydler – drums
- Jim Sclavunos – percussion, vibraphone, tubular bells, Wurlitzer, backing vocals
- George Vjestica – acoustic guitar, backing vocals

Additional musicians

- Else Torp – additional vocals (track 7)
- Ellie Wyatt – violin
- Charlotte Glason – viola
- Joe Giddey – cello

Technical personnel

- Kevin Paul – recording, additional overdubs, mixing
- Nick Launay – recording
- Jake Jackson – additional overdubs, mixing
- Nick Cave – mixing
- Warren Ellis – mixing
- Jim Sclavunos – mixing
- Chris Blakey – mixing assistance
- Nicolas Quéré – mixing assistance
- Arnaud Bequet – mixing assistance
- Jonathan Ratovoarisoa – mixing assistance
- John Prestage – mixing assistance
- John Davis – mastering

Artwork

- Hingston Studio – design
- Alwin Küchler – photography

== Charts ==
=== Weekly charts ===
Chart (2016)	Peak position
Australian Albums (ARIA)	1
Austrian Albums (Ö3 Austria)	2
Belgian Albums (Ultratop Flanders)	1
Belgian Albums (Ultratop Wallonia)	3
Canadian Albums (Billboard)	22
Danish Albums (Hitlisten)	1
Dutch Albums (Album Top 100)	2
Finnish Albums (Suomen virallinen lista)	1
French Albums (SNEP)	7
German Albums (Offizielle Top 100)	3
Greek Albums (IFPI)	2
Hungarian Albums (MAHASZ)	28
Irish Albums (IRMA)	1
Irish Independent Albums (IRMA)	1
Italian Albums (FIMI)	2
New Zealand Albums (RMNZ)	1
Norwegian Albums (VG-lista)	1
Polish Albums (ZPAV)	3
Portuguese Albums (AFP)	1
Scottish Albums (Official Charts)	2
Spanish Albums (Promusicae)	7
Swedish Albums (Sverigetopplistan)	2
Swiss Albums (Schweizer Hitparade)	2
UK Albums (Official Charts)	2
US Billboard 200	27

=== Year-end charts ===
Chart (2016)	Position
Australian Albums (ARIA)	62
Belgian Albums (Ultratop Flanders)	12
Belgian Albums (Ultratop Wallonia)	114
Dutch Albums (MegaCharts)	57
Chart (2017)	Position
Belgian Albums (Ultratop Flanders)	46

== Certifications ==
Region	Certification	Certified units/sales
Australia (ARIA)	Gold	35,000^{‡}
Belgium (BRMA)	Platinum	30,000^{‡}
United Kingdom (BPI)	Silver	74,110
^{‡} Sales+streaming figures based on certification alone.
