= Push the Sky Away =

Studio album by Nick Cave and the Bad Seeds
- Released: 18 February 2013
- Recorded: December 2011–August 2012 at La Fabrique in Saint-Rémy-de-Provence, France
- Genre: Rock; blues
- Length: 42:40
- Label: Bad Seed Ltd
- Producer: Nick Launay with Nick Cave and the Bad Seeds

Nick Cave and the Bad Seeds chronology
| Live at the Royal Albert Hall (2008) | Push the Sky Away (2013) | Live from KCRW (2013) |

Singles from Push the Sky Away
- 1. "We No Who U R" Released: 3 December 2012; 2. "Jubilee Street" Released: 15 January 2013; 3. "Mermaids" Released: 20 May 2013

Push the Sky Away is the fifteenth studio album by the Australian rock band Nick Cave and the Bad Seeds, released on 18 February 2013 on the band's own label Bad Seed Ltd. Recorded at La Fabrique in southern France, with producer Nick Launay, it is their first album not to include founding member Mick Harvey, following his departure in January 2009. The album was the first to feature founding member Barry Adamson since Your Funeral... My Trial (1986), and the last to feature keyboardist and pianist Conway Savage, who died in 2018.

Billboard described the album as the band's "commercial breakthrough". It was their first number-one album in Australia, and it also reached number one in six other countries. It earned a then-career-high peak of No. 3 in the UK and No. 29 in the US, becoming the band's first top 50 album in the latter.

== Recording ==
Push the Sky Away was recorded at La Fabrique, a recording studio based in a 19th-century mansion in Saint-Rémy-de-Provence, France. Nick Launay produced, having overseen the Bad Seeds' three previous studio albums - Nocturama (2003), Abattoir Blues/The Lyre of Orpheus (2004) and Dig, Lazarus, Dig!!! (2008) - along with Grinderman's two studio albums. Segments of the recording sessions were featured in the official trailer for Push the Sky Away, which was posted on YouTube upon the album's announcement. The band entered the studio when Nick Cave had "unformed and pupal" ideas, and the band "[transformed] them into things of wonder."

Founding member Barry Adamson made his first recording appearance with the band since Your Funeral... My Trial. Reflecting on the experience, he noted: "It was very weird. Mick Harvey had left and there was Warren [Ellis] and Thomas [Wydler] and Jim Sclavunos - and Martyn [P. Casey] - and none of them were Bad Seeds when I was a Bad Seed, yet they'd all been in the band for much longer than me. I don't mean to sound derogatory, but it was like it had normalised. Nick Cave had found another way. He was using convention and turning it on its head. That's what got me. I thought, 'Ah, he's still fucking doing it. He's still fucking doing it.'"

The process of the recording was documented in the documentary, 20,000 Days on Earth, released on September 17, 2014.

== Composition ==
Describing Push the Sky Away in the album's press release, Nick Cave said "if I were to use that threadbare metaphor of albums being like children, then Push The Sky Away is the ghost-baby in the incubator and Warren's loops are its tiny, trembling heart-beat." The songs on the album were written over the course of twelve months and "took form in a modest notebook" kept by Cave. The notebook contained notes on the album's songs, which were composed from "Googling curiosities, being entranced by exotic English Wikipedia entries 'whether they're true or not'." The song We Real Cool also mentions Wikipedia by name. According to Cave, the songs illustrate how the internet has influenced "significant events, momentary fads and mystically-tinged absurdities" and "question how we might recognise and assign weight to what's genuinely important."

Due to health problems longtime drummer Thomas Wydler was unable to tour with the band in support of the album. Cave stated: "In some ways the new album is carried by [Wydler] and his participation. It's very sad that he can´t do the tour because of health reasons. That is a hard blow for us. He is the sound of this album."

== Packaging ==
The cover image shows Cave opening a window shutter to illuminate his naked wife, Susie Bick, and was shot by Dominique Issermann in the couple's own bedroom. The photograph was taken while Issermann was at Cave and Bick's home during a photo shoot for a fashion magazine that Bick was modelling for. Cave was assisting with the shoot and was asked by Issermann to open the shutters to let in more light. Bick was in the middle of changing and decided to drop her robe as Cave was opening up the shutters and Issermann impulsively decided to capture the scene. Cave and Bick were very pleased with how the photo came out and, after consulting with his bandmates and his office, elected to use it as the album cover.

== Release ==
Push the Sky Away was announced for release on 27 November 2012. Released on 18 February 2013, the album was made available on standard CD, LP, digital download, limited edition deluxe CD/DVD and a "Super Deluxe" box set. The album's lead single, "We No Who U R", was released as a digital download on 3 December and its second single, "Jubilee Street", was released on 15 January 2013. Push the Sky Away sold 15,000 copies in its first week of release in the United States.

=== Tour ===
Prior to the album's announcement, Nick Cave and the Bad Seeds disclosed plans to perform at Humphrey's Concerts By the Sea in San Diego, California 16 April 2013. The announcement sparked rumours that the band would also perform at the 2013 Coachella Valley Music and Arts Festival, which was later confirmed. On 3 December 2012, the band announced an Australian and North American tour accompanying Push the Sky Away's release. The six-date Australian leg of the tour commenced on 26 February 2013 in Sydney and concluded on 8 March in Brisbane, and the twelve-date North American leg commenced on 14 March in Dallas, Texas and concluded on 3 April in Denver, Colorado. Several dates at major European festivals were later announced, including performances at Primavera Sound in Spain, NorthSide Festival in Denmark, Exit Festival in Serbia and Greenville Music Festival in Germany.

Nick Cave and the Bad Seeds performed a one-off debut of Push the Sky Away in its entirety at Fonda Theatre in Hollywood, California on 21 February 2013. The performance was streamed live on YouTube and made available for stream for an additional 24 hours.

== Reception ==
Professional ratings
Aggregate scores
| Source | Rating |
|---|---|
| AnyDecentMusic? | 8.1/10 |
| Metacritic | 81/100 |
Review scores
| Source | Rating |
| AllMusic | 3.5/5 stars |
| The A.V. Club | B− |
| Entertainment Weekly | A |
| The Guardian | 4/5 stars |
| The Independent | 5/5 stars |
| Los Angeles Times | 3/4 stars |
| NME | 9/10 |
| Pitchfork | 8.0/10 |
| Rolling Stone | 3/5 stars |
| Spin | 8/10 |

Push the Sky Away was acclaimed by music critics. At Metacritic, which assigns a normalised rating out of 100 to reviews from mainstream critics, the album received an average score of 81, based on 46 reviews, indicating "universal acclaim". Allmusic rated Push the Sky Away three and a half out of five stars and reviewer Thom Jurek said the "songs contain simple melodies and arrangements that offer the appearance of vulnerability and tenderness [but] it is inside this framework that they eventually reveal their sharp fangs and malcontent." Writing for The A.V. Club, Jason Heller asserted that the album's "oppressively hollow minimalism is both its biggest drawback and its greatest strength", noted the lack of "chemistry" in Mick Harvey's absence, and gave it a B− grade. BBC Music writer James Skinner referred to the album as "certainly a far stranger, subtler record than that last Bad Seeds outing" and "an LP as weighty, compelling and brilliant as The Bad Seeds have ever produced." Greg Kot of the Chicago Tribune called Push the Sky Away "an album without any shocking turns" but said "that 'tiny, trembling heart beat,' as Cave calls it, starts to sound louder with each listen" in his three out of four star review. In his review for The Guardian, Dave Simpson awarded the album four out of five stars, described it as "funeral-paced songs and stripped-down music that calls to mind Leonard Cohen fronting James Blake minimalism" and drew comparisons between the album and The Boatman's Call (1997).

Los Angeles Times' reviewer Randall Roberts said Push the Sky Away "is not a work to be appreciated casually. Cave delves into a meandering, meditative world that rarely offers the kind of hooks or tethers that dictate toe-tapping singalongs" in his three out of four star review. Writing for the NME, Jenny Stevens described the album as a "majestic and desolate masterpiece" and noted that the band "merges the experimentation and freedom of their side projects with Cave's most tender songcraft", rating the album nine out of ten. Pitchfork rated Push the Sky Away eight out of ten and reviewer Stuart Berman praised its "foggy reveries built upon ominously rumbling bass lines, twitchy rhythmic tics, and hushed-voice intimations", adding "it may not erupt with same force as the Bad Seeds' stormiest gestures, but the underlying menace fuelling it remains."

In his three star review for Rolling Stone, Joe Gross said Push the Sky Away "is full of tiny sounds—plinking guitars, pulsing bass [and] lazy subtle drums." Writing for Slant Magazine, Mark Collett stated: "subtle, sprawling, and often achingly beautiful, Push the Sky Away is a late-career masterpiece from an antipodean force of nature" and summarised that it was "an album of thrilling darkness pierced by moments of brilliant light." USA Today' reviewer Edna Gundersen wrote that the release "may be more spare, somber and haunting than recent collections, but Cave's dark menace, devilish wit and yarn-spinning voodoo compensate for a lack of guitar bluster."

== Commercial performance ==
The album became their first Australian chart topper, debuting at #1 on the ARIA Charts in February 2013.

The album debuted at No. 29 on Billboard 200, and No. 9 on Top Rock Albums for charts dated March 9, 2013, selling 15,000 copies in the first week. The album has sold 57,000 copies in the United States as of July 2016.

== Track listing ==
All lyrics are written by Nick Cave; all music is composed by Nick Cave and Warren Ellis unless otherwise noted.

| No. | Title | Music | Length |
|---|---|---|---|
| 1. | "We No Who U R" | | 4:04 |
| 2. | "Wide Lovely Eyes" | | 3:40 |
| 3. | "Water's Edge" | Cave, Ellis, Thomas Wydler | 3:49 |
| 4. | "Jubilee Street" | | 6:35 |
| 5. | "Mermaids" | | 3:49 |
| 6. | "We Real Cool" | | 4:18 |
| 7. | "Finishing Jubilee Street" | Cave, Ellis, Wydler | 4:28 |
| 8. | "Higgs Boson Blues" | | 7:50 |
| 9. | "Push the Sky Away" | | 4:07 |
| Total length: | | | 42:40 |

iTunes bonus material
| No. | Title | Length |
|---|---|---|
| 10. | "The Making of Push the Sky Away" (video track) | 6:40 |
| Total length: | | 49:20 |

Deluxe limited edition bonus 7"
| No. | Title | Music | Length |
|---|---|---|---|
| 1. | "Needle Boy" | | 4:04 |
| 2. | "Lightning Bolts" | Cave, Ellis, Wydler | 3:42 |
| Total length: | | | 7:46 |

Deluxe limited edition bonus DVD
| No. | Title | Music | Length |
|---|---|---|---|
| 1. | "Needle Boy" (video track) | | 4:04 |
| 2. | "Lightning Bolts" (video track) | Cave, Ellis, Wydler | 3:42 |
| Total length: | | | 7:46 |

== Personnel ==
All personnel credits adapted from Push the Sky Away's liner notes.

Nick Cave and the Bad Seeds

- Nick Cave – vocals, piano, electric piano, additional mixing, design
- Warren Ellis – violin, viola, tenor guitar, flute, synthesizer, electric piano, loops, backing vocals, additional mixing
- Martyn P. Casey – bass, backing vocals
- Conway Savage – vocals, backing vocals
- Thomas Wydler – drums, backing vocals
- Jim Sclavunos – percussion, backing vocals

Additional musicians

- Barry Adamson – bass (7, 9), backing vocals
- George Vjestica – twelve-string guitar (4, 5), backing vocals (5, 8)
- Chris Dauray – saxophone (8)
- Jessica Neilson – bass clarinet (8)
- Ryan Porter – trombone (8)
- Antonio Beliveau – backing vocals (1, 3, 7, 9)
- Aya Peard – backing vocals (1, 3, 7, 9)
- Jason Evigan – backing vocals (1, 3, 7, 9)
- Natalie Wilde – backing vocals (1, 3, 7, 9)
- Martha Skye Murphy – backing vocals (1, 3, 7)
- Children of Ecole Saint Martin – backing vocals (4, 8, 9)

Technical personnel

- Nick Launay – production, recording, mixing
- Nick Cave and the Bad Seeds – production
- Kevin Paul – additional recording
- Anna Laverty – additional recording, vocal engineer, recording assistant
- Damien Arlot – recording assistant
- Thomas Lefèbvre – recording assistant
- Adam "Atom" Greenspan – mixing assistant
- Tim Young – mastering

Design personnel

- Tom Hingston – design
- Dominique Issermann – photography, cover art
- Cat Stevens – photography

== Charts ==
=== Weekly charts ===
| Chart (2013) | Peak position |
|---|---|
| Australian Albums (ARIA) | 1 |
| Austrian Albums (Ö3 Austria) | 1 |
| Belgian Albums (Ultratop Flanders) | 1 |
| Belgian Albums (Ultratop Wallonia) | 5 |
| Canadian Albums (Billboard) | 20 |
| Danish Albums (Hitlisten) | 1 |
| Dutch Albums (Album Top 100) | 1 |
| Finnish Albums (Suomen virallinen lista) | 5 |
| French Albums (SNEP) | 7 |
| German Albums (Offizielle Top 100) | 2 |
| Irish Albums (IRMA) | 3 |
| Irish Independent Albums Chart | 1 |
| Italian Albums (FIMI) | 18 |
| New Zealand Albums (RMNZ) | 1 |
| Norwegian Albums (VG-lista) | 2 |
| Polish Albums (OLiS) | 2 |
| Portuguese Albums (AFP) | 1 |
| Spanish Albums (PROMUSICAE) | 4 |
| Scottish Albums (OCC) | 3 |
| Swedish Albums (Sverigetopplistan) | 3 |
| Swiss Albums (Schweizer Hitparade) | 2 |
| UK Albums (OCC) | 3 |
| UK Indie (OCC) | 1 |
| US Billboard 200 | 29 |
| US Top Alternative Albums (Billboard) | 8 |
| US Independent Albums (Billboard) | 6 |
| US Top Rock Albums (Billboard) | 9 |
| US Indie Store Album Sales (Billboard) | 1 |

=== Year-end charts ===
| Chart (2013) | Position |
|---|---|
| Australian Albums (ARIA) | 83 |
| Austrian Albums (Ö3 Austria) | 66 |
| Belgian Albums (Ultratop Flanders) | 9 |
| Belgian Albums (Ultratop Wallonia) | 106 |
| Dutch Albums (Album Top 100) | 37 |
| French Albums (SNEP) | 176 |
| UK Albums (OCC) | 156 |

| Chart (2014) | Position |
|---|---|
| Belgian Albums (Ultratop Flanders) | 160 |

== Certifications ==
Sales certifications for Push the Sky Away
| Region | Certification | Certified units/sales |
|---|---|---|
| Australia (ARIA) | Gold | 35,000^{^} |
| Denmark (IFPI Danmark) | Gold | 10,000^{^} |
| Portugal (AFP) | Platinum | 15,000^{^} |
| United Kingdom (BPI) | Gold | 100,000^{‡} |
^{^} Shipments figures based on certification alone.^{‡} Sales+streaming figures based on certification alone.
