= The Best of Nick Cave and The Bad Seeds =

The Best of Nick Cave and the Bad Seeds

Greatest hits album by Nick Cave and the Bad Seeds
- Released: 11 May 1998 (UK); 26 May 1998 (US)
- Recorded: 1983–1997
- Length: 75:38
- Label: Mute Records
- Producer: Nick Cave, Flood, David Briggs, Tony Cohen, Victor Van Vugt, The Bad Seeds

Nick Cave and the Bad Seeds chronology
The Boatman's Call (1997)	The Best of Nick Cave and the Bad Seeds (1998)	No More Shall We Part (2001)

Professional ratings
Review scores
Source	Rating
AllMusic	4.5/5 stars
NME	9/10
Pitchfork	9.0/10
The Rolling Stone Album Guide	4/5 stars

The Best of Nick Cave and the Bad Seeds is a compilation album by Australian rock band Nick Cave and the Bad Seeds, released on 11 May 1998.

Cave asked each of the Bad Seeds members, past and present, to choose their favourite tracks from the ten albums—their lists would then be discussed until a final list was produced. Only guitarist and founding Bad Seed Mick Harvey responded, and it is his listing, unchanged, that makes up The Best of.

As of 2001, the album has sold 500,000 copies worldwide.

== Track listing ==
No.	Title	Originally appears on:	Length
1.	"Deanna"	Tender Prey (1988)	3:36
2.	"Red Right Hand" (Single Version)	Let Love In (1994)	4:48
3.	"Straight to You"	Henry's Dream (1992)	4:35
4.	"Tupelo" (Single Version)	The Firstborn Is Dead (1985)	5:12
5.	"Nobody's Baby Now"	Let Love In (1994)	3:53
6.	"Stranger Than Kindness"	Your Funeral... My Trial (1986)	4:42
7.	"Into My Arms"	The Boatman's Call (1997)	4:14
8.	"(Are You) The One That I've Been Waiting For?"	The Boatman's Call (1997)	4:06
9.	"The Carny"	Your Funeral... My Trial (1986)	8:01
10.	"Do You Love Me?" (Single Version)	Let Love In (1994)	4:37
11.	"The Mercy Seat" (Single Version)	Tender Prey (1988)	5:08
12.	"Henry Lee" (featuring PJ Harvey)	Murder Ballads (1996)	3:56
13.	"The Weeping Song" (Single Version)	The Good Son (1990)	4:20
14.	"The Ship Song" (Single Version)	The Good Son (1990)	4:42
15.	"Where the Wild Roses Grow" (featuring Kylie Minogue)	Murder Ballads (1996)	3:57
16.	"From Her to Eternity"	From Her to Eternity (1984)	5:32
Total length:			75:38

Note: Tracks 2, 4, 10, 11, 13 and 14 are the edited single versions, but are not listed as edits in the liner notes.

=== Special edition ===
The album was also released as a special edition with a live bonus disc, titled Live at the Royal Albert Hall, recorded on 19 and 20 May 1997. This bonus CD was later released in 2008 as a regular album, with four additional tracks and without "The Weeping Song".

Live at the Royal Albert Hall
No.	Title	Length
1.	"Lime Tree Arbour"	3:42
2.	"Stranger Than Kindness"	5:02
3.	"Red Right Hand"	5:18
4.	"I Let Love In"	4:12
5.	"Brompton Oratory"	3:47
6.	"Henry Lee"	4:00
7.	"The Weeping Song"	4:38
8.	"The Ship Song"	4:12
9.	"Where the Wild Roses Grow"	4:01

== Musicians ==
- Nick Cave – Vocals, Hammond, Organ, Oscillator, Piano, Harmonica, Backing Vocals, String Arrangement
- Blixa Bargeld – Guitar, "Boss Bellini", Backing Vocals, Slide Guitar, "Father" Vocal (on "The Weeping Song")
- Mick Harvey – Drums, Bass, Acoustic Guitar, Guitar, Shaker, Bell, Rhythm Guitar, Extra Piano, Hammond, Bass Guitar, Bass Organ, Backing Vocals, Piano, Xylophone, Glockenspiel, Loops, Vibraphone, Percussion, String Arrangement
- Kid Congo Powers – Guitar
- Martyn P. Casey – Bass, Backing Vocals
- Thomas Wydler – Drums, Timpani, Fish, Backing Vocals, Percussion
- Conway Savage – Piano, Backing Vocals
- Barry Adamson – Drums, Hammond, Backing Vocals, Bass
- Jim Sclavunos – Drums, Bells
- Tex Perkins – Backing Vocals
- Rowland S. Howard – Backing Vocals
- Roland Wolf – Guitar
- Gini Ball – Strings
- Audrey Riley – Strings
- Chris Tombling – Strings
- PJ Harvey – Vocals
- Kylie Minogue – Vocals
- Jen Anderson – Strings
- Sue Simpson – Strings
- Kerran Coulter – Strings
- Helen Mountfort – Strings
- Hugo Race – Guitar

== Charts ==
=== Weekly charts ===
Chart (1998)	Peak position
Australian Albums (ARIA)	2
Austrian Albums (Ö3 Austria)	7
Belgian Albums (Ultratop Flanders)	5
Dutch Albums (Album Top 100)	90
European Albums (Eurotipsheet)	16
Finnish Albums (Suomen virallinen lista)	12
German Albums (Offizielle Top 100)	26
New Zealand Albums (RMNZ)	8
Norwegian Albums (VG-lista)	1
Scottish Albums (OCC)	22
Swedish Albums (Sverigetopplistan)	17
UK Albums (OCC)	11

== Certifications ==
Region	Certification	Certified units/sales
Australia (ARIA)	Gold	35,000^{^}
United Kingdom (BPI)	Gold	100,000^{^}
United States	—	50,000
Summaries
Worldwide	—	500,000
^{^} Shipments figures based on certification alone.
