= List of Nick Cave and the Bad Seeds members =

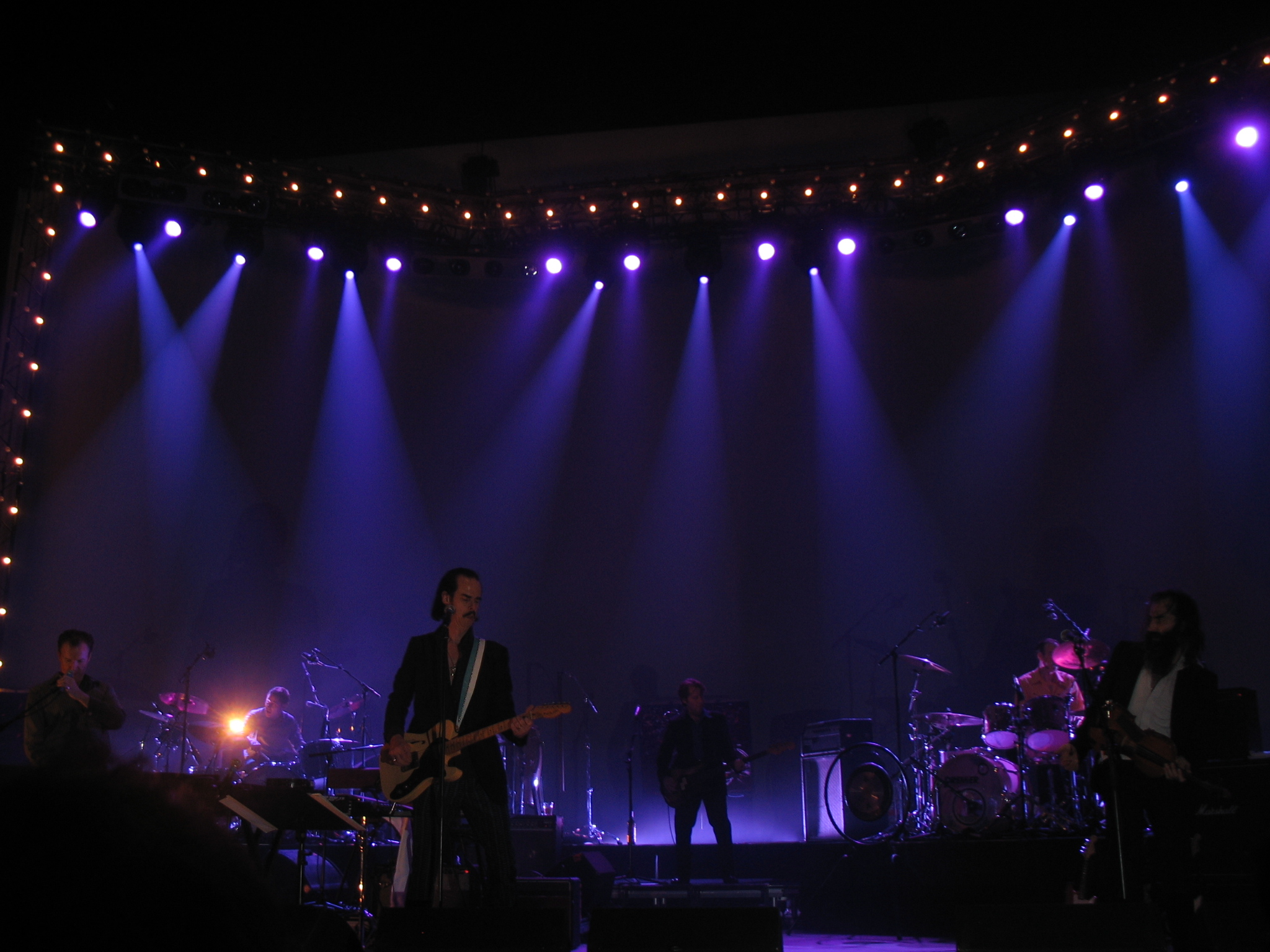
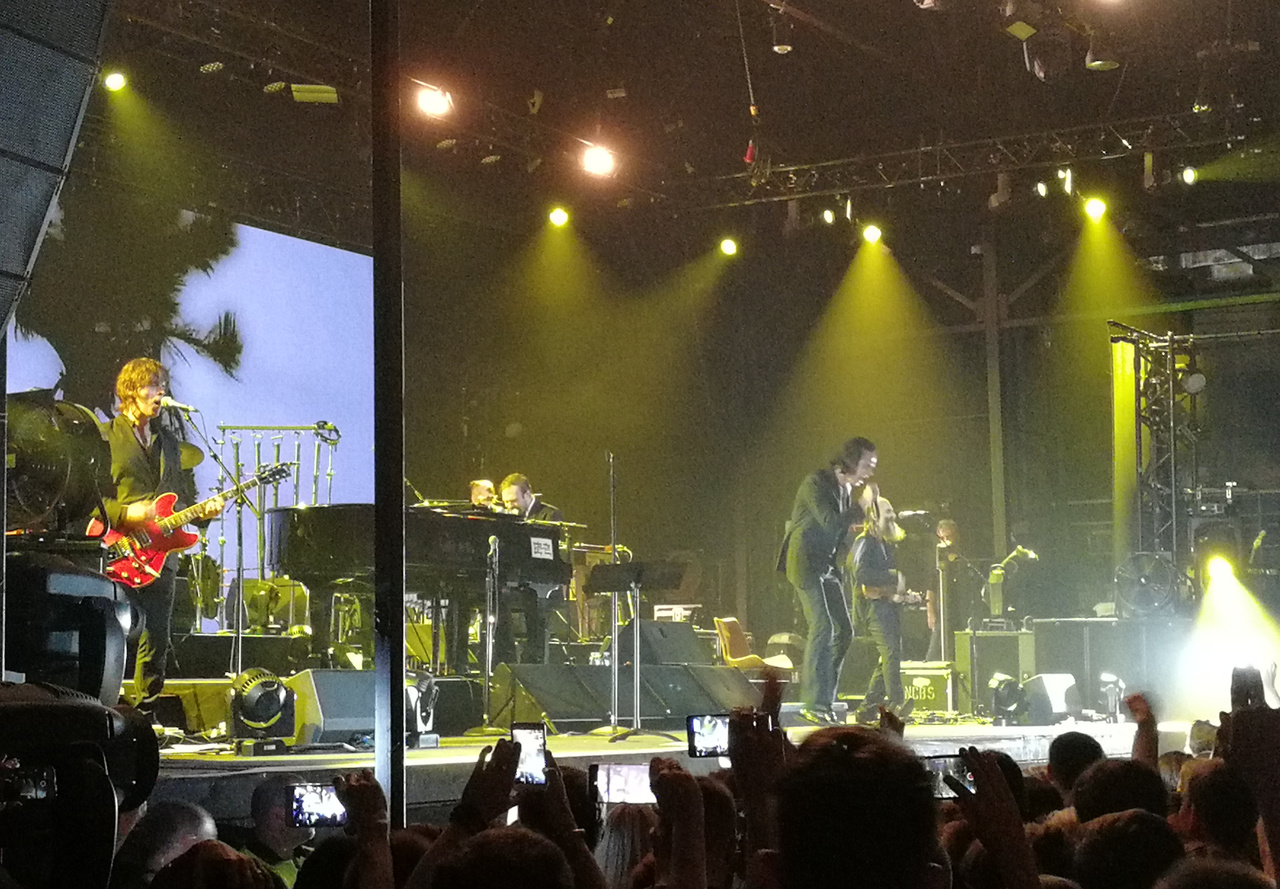
Nick Cave and the Bad Seeds performing in 2008 and 2018.

Nick Cave and the Bad Seeds are an Australian rock band from Melbourne. Formed by eponymous vocalist Nick Cave and multi-instrumentalist Mick Harvey after the breakup of The Birthday Party in August 1983, the original lineup of the group also included German guitarist Blixa Bargeld and English bassist Barry Adamson. The band's first tour, later in the year, featured guitarist Hugo Race in place of Bargeld (who was touring with Einstürzende Neubauten) and bassist Tracy Pew (also formerly of The Birthday Party), the latter of whom left early the next year. They released their debut album From Her to Eternity in June 1984. Race left later in the year, although performed as a guest on several Bad Seeds releases later. The group continued briefly as a four-piece, releasing The Firstborn Is Dead in June 1985.

Shortly after the release of the band's second album, Thomas Wydler joined as the new drummer for Bad Seeds, with Harvey moving to focus primarily on guitar and keyboards. Two albums followed in 1986 – Kicking Against the Pricks and Your Funeral... My Trial – the latter of which featured Adamson on only two tracks, having recently left. Harvey took over on bass, with Kid Congo Powers joining on guitar and keyboardist Roland Wolf also joining. Tender Prey was released in 1988, before Wolf was dismissed the next year due to personality conflicts with Cave. The 1990 follow-up The Good Son was also the last Bad Seeds album for Powers, who left later in the year. Harvey took over from Powers on guitar, as bassist Martyn P. Casey and keyboardist Conway Savage joined to expand the group to a six-piece.

The lineup of Nick Cave and the Bad Seeds remained stable throughout the 1990s, save for two additions. First was second drummer and percussionist Jim Sclavunos, who joined in 1994 during the promotional tour for Let Love In. Second was violinist and multi-instrumentalist Warren Ellis, who became an official members of the group in 1997 after having featured as a session and touring musician. In March 2003, founding member Bargeld left the Bad Seeds in order to "concentrate on other creative areas in [his] life", describing his departure as "nothing to do with artistic or personal differences with the band". The guitarist was replaced by James Johnston, who had previously toured briefly with the group in 1994. Johnston remained a member of the group until after the release of Dig, Lazarus, Dig!!! in 2008.

On 22 January 2009, it was announced that Harvey, the last remaining original member of the Bad Seeds besides Cave, had left the band in order to pursue other projects. He was replaced for shows later in the year by Ed Kuepper. After a brief hiatus, the band returned in 2013 with Push the Sky Away, during which time Barry Adamson returned to the band on percussion, keyboards and drums, filling in for Wydler who was absent to illness. Kuepper briefly toured with the group again, before being replaced by George Vjestica. Adamson remained until early 2015, when Wydler returned to touring and keyboards were taken over by Larry Mullins (also known as Toby Dammit). Savage was forced to leave the touring group in early 2017 after being diagnosed with a brain tumour. He died the following September.

When the band returned to touring in 2022, they were joined by backing vocalists Janet Ramus, T Jae Cole and Subrina McCalla and keyboardist Carly Paradis, covering for Mullins who moved to drums, covering for Wydler. Bassist Colin Greenwood also toured with the band in 2024 and 2025, while Casey stayed home for health reasons.

== Members ==
=== Current ===
Image	Name	Years active	Instruments	Release contributions
	Nick Cave	1983–present	vocals; piano; organ; guitar; harmonica; percussion	all Nick Cave and the Bad Seeds releases
	Thomas Wydler	1985–present (studio only 2013–2015, 2022–present)	drums; percussion; backing vocals	all Bad Seeds releases from Kicking Against the Pricks (1986) onwards, except Live from KCRW (2013)
	Martyn P. Casey	1990–present	bass; backing vocals	all Bad Seeds releases from Henry's Dream (1992) onwards
	Jim Sclavunos	1994–present	percussion; drums; vibraphone; backing vocals	all Bad Seeds releases from Murder Ballads (1996) onwards
	Warren Ellis	1997–present (session 1993–97)	violin; synthesizers; programming; tenor guitar; mandolin; piano; bouzouki; flute; accordion; backing vocals	all Bad Seeds releases from Let Love In (1994) onwards
	George Vjestica	2013–present	guitars; backing vocals	Push the Sky Away (2013) – three tracks only; all Bad Seeds releases from Skeleton Tree (2016) onwards

=== Former ===
Image	Name	Years active	Instruments	Release contributions
	Mick Harvey	1983–2009	guitars; bass; drums; percussion; piano; organ; xylophone; vibraphone; loops; samples; turntables; vocals	all Bad Seeds releases from From Her to Eternity (1984) to Live at the Royal Albert Hall (2008)
	Blixa Bargeld	1983–2003	guitars; slide guitar; pedal steel guitar; backing and some lead vocals	all Bad Seeds releases from From Her to Eternity (1984) to Nocturama (2003); Live at the Royal Albert Hall (2008)
	Barry Adamson	1983–1986; 2013–2015	bass; guitars; organ; drums; percussion; backing vocals	From Her to Eternity (1984); The Firstborn Is Dead (1985); Kicking Against the Pricks (1986); Your Funeral... My Trial (1986) – two tracks only; Push the Sky Away (2013); Live from KCRW (2013)
	Hugo Race	1983–1984	guitars; backing vocals	From Her to Eternity (1984); Kicking Against the Pricks (1986) – four tracks only; Tender Prey (1988) – two tracks only; Murder Ballads (1996) - one track only
	Kid Congo Powers (Brian Tristan)	1986–1990	guitars; backing vocals	Tender Prey (1988); The Good Son (1990)
	Roland Wolf	1986–1989 (died 1995)	piano; organ; guitars; backing vocals	Tender Prey (1988); The Good Son (1990) – one track only
	Conway Savage	1990–2017 (died 2018)	piano; organ; backing and some lead vocals	all Bad Seeds releases from Henry's Dream (1992) to Push the Sky Away (2013), except Dig, Lazarus, Dig!!! (2008)
	James Johnston	2003–2008 (touring 1994)	guitars; organ; backing vocals	Murder Ballads – one track only (1996); Abattoir Blues / The Lyre of Orpheus (2004); The Abattoir Blues Tour (2007); Dig, Lazarus, Dig!!! (2008)

=== Touring ===
Image	Name	Years active	Instruments	Details
	Tracy Pew	1983–1984 (died 1986)	bass	Pew performed between December 1983 and January 1984, with Adamson substituting for Bargeld on guitar.
	Edward Clayton-Jones	1984	guitar	Clayton-Jones substituted for Blixa Bargeld during a European tour in May 1984.
	Christoph Dreher	1985	bass	Dreher temporarily replaced Barry Adamson during a UK tour in April 1985.
	Rowland S. Howard	1985 (died 2009)	guitar; backing vocals	Howard temporarily replaced Blixa Bargeld during a UK tour in April 1985.
	Ed Kuepper	2009; 2013	guitar; backing vocals	Kuepper filled in on guitar following Harvey's departure in early 2009, and again in early 2013.
	Larry Mullins (aka. Toby Dammit)	2015–present	piano; keyboards; drums; percussion; backing vocals	Mullins took over keyboards in the touring lineup of the Bad Seeds from Adamson in early 2015, he has also replaced Wydler as drummer, starting with the 2022 European Tour.
	Carly Paradis	2022–present	keyboards	Paradis joined the band, starting with their 2022 European tour on keyboards filling in for Mullins who took over drumming duties.
	Janet Ramus	2022–present	backing vocals	Ramus, Cole and McCalla joined the band on their 2022 European tour. Ramus and Cole previously toured with Nick Cave and Warren Ellis on their 2021–2022 Carnage tour.
	T Jae Cole	2022–present	backing vocals	Ramus, Cole and McCalla joined the band on their 2022 European tour. Ramus and Cole previously toured with Nick Cave and Warren Ellis on their 2021–2022 Carnage tour.
	Subrina McCalla	2022–present	backing vocals	Ramus, Cole and McCalla joined the band on their 2022 European tour. Ramus and Cole previously toured with Nick Cave and Warren Ellis on their 2021–2022 Carnage tour.
	Miça Townsend	2024–present	backing vocals	Townsend and Rose joined the band in 2024.
	Wendi Rose	2024–present	backing vocals	Townsend and Rose joined the band in 2024.
	Colin Greenwood	2024–2025	bass	Standing in for Martyn P. Casey for the 2024 UK and European Tour. Continued to tour with the band into 2025.

== Lineups ==
Period	Members	Releases
August – November 1983	Nick Cave – vocals, piano, organ, harmonica; Blixa Bargeld – guitar, backing vocals; Barry Adamson – bass, guitar, backing vocals; Mick Harvey – drums, piano, organ, backing vocals; Jim Thirlwell – bass, guitar (session only)	From Her to Eternity (1984) – three tracks
December 1983 – January 1984	Nick Cave – vocals, piano, organ, harmonica; Barry Adamson – guitar, bass, backing vocals; Mick Harvey – drums, piano, organ, backing vocals; Hugo Race – guitar, backing vocals; Tracy Pew – bass (touring only)	none
February – April 1984	Nick Cave – vocals, piano, organ, harmonica; Blixa Bargeld – guitar, backing vocals; Barry Adamson – bass, guitar, backing vocals; Mick Harvey – drums, piano, organ, backing vocals; Hugo Race – guitar, backing vocals	From Her to Eternity (1984)
May 1984	Nick Cave – vocals, piano, organ, harmonica; Barry Adamson – bass, guitar, backing vocals; Mick Harvey – drums, piano, organ, backing vocals; Hugo Race – guitar, backing vocals; Edward Clayton-Jones – guitar (touring only)	none
Mid-1984	Nick Cave – vocals, piano, organ, harmonica; Blixa Bargeld – guitar, backing vocals; Barry Adamson – bass, guitar, backing vocals; Mick Harvey – drums, piano, organ, backing vocals; Hugo Race – guitar, backing vocals	none
Late 1984 – early 1985	Nick Cave – vocals, piano, organ, harmonica; Blixa Bargeld – guitar, backing vocals; Barry Adamson – bass, guitar, backing vocals; Mick Harvey – drums, piano, organ, backing vocals	The Firstborn Is Dead (1985)
April 1985	Nick Cave – vocals, piano, organ, harmonica; Mick Harvey – drums, piano, organ, backing vocals; Rowland S. Howard – guitar (touring only); Christoph Dreher – bass (touring only); Thomas Wydler – drums (touring only)	none
May 1985 – July 1986	Nick Cave – vocals, piano, organ, harmonica; Blixa Bargeld – guitar, backing vocals; Mick Harvey – guitar, piano, organ, backing vocals; Barry Adamson – bass, guitar, backing vocals; Thomas Wydler – drums, percussion, backing vocals	Kicking Against the Pricks (1986); Your Funeral... My Trial (1986) – two tracks
July – August 1986	Nick Cave – vocals, piano, organ, harmonica; Blixa Bargeld – guitar, backing vocals; Mick Harvey – bass, piano, organ, guitar, drums, backing vocals; Thomas Wydler – drums, percussion, backing vocals	Your Funeral... My Trial (1986)
September 1986 – July 1989	Nick Cave – vocals, piano, organ, harmonica; Blixa Bargeld – guitar, backing vocals; Mick Harvey – bass, piano, organ, guitar, backing vocals; Thomas Wydler – drums, percussion, backing vocals; Kid Congo Powers – guitar, backing vocals; Roland Wolf – piano, organ, backing vocals, guitar	Tender Prey (1988); The Good Son (1989) – one track
August 1989 – May 1990	Nick Cave – vocals, piano, organ, harmonica; Blixa Bargeld – guitar, backing vocals; Thomas Wydler – drums, percussion, backing vocals; Kid Congo Powers – guitar, backing vocals; Mick Harvey – bass, guitar, piano, organ, backing vocals	The Good Son (1989)
May 1990 – March 1994	Nick Cave – vocals, piano, organ, harmonica; Blixa Bargeld – guitar, backing vocals; Mick Harvey – guitar, piano, organ, backing vocals; Thomas Wydler – drums, percussion, backing vocals; Martyn P. Casey – bass, backing vocals; Conway Savage – piano, organ, backing vocals	Henry's Dream (1992); Live Seeds (1993); Let Love In (1994)
March – July 1994	Nick Cave – vocals, piano, organ, harmonica; Blixa Bargeld – guitar, backing vocals; Mick Harvey – guitar, piano, organ, backing vocals; Thomas Wydler – drums, percussion, backing vocals; Martyn P. Casey – bass, backing vocals; Conway Savage – piano, organ, backing vocals; Jim Sclavunos – percussion, drums, backing vocals	none
July – September 1994	Nick Cave – vocals, piano, organ, harmonica; Mick Harvey – guitar, piano, organ, backing vocals; Thomas Wydler – drums, percussion, backing vocals; Martyn P. Casey – bass, backing vocals; Conway Savage – piano, organ, backing vocals; Jim Sclavunos – percussion, drums, backing vocals; James Johnston – guitar, backing vocals (touring only)	none
October 1994 – March 1997	Nick Cave – vocals, piano, organ, harmonica; Blixa Bargeld – guitar, backing vocals; Mick Harvey – guitar, piano, organ, backing vocals; Thomas Wydler – drums, percussion, backing vocals; Martyn P. Casey – bass, backing vocals; Conway Savage – piano, organ, backing vocals; Jim Sclavunos – percussion, drums, backing vocals; Warren Ellis – violin, mandolin, flute, et al. (session only)	Murder Ballads (1996)
March 1997 – March 2003	Nick Cave – vocals, piano, organ, harmonica; Blixa Bargeld – guitar, backing vocals; Mick Harvey – guitar, piano, organ, backing vocals; Thomas Wydler – drums, percussion, backing vocals; Martyn P. Casey – bass, backing vocals; Conway Savage – piano, organ, backing vocals; Jim Sclavunos – percussion, drums, backing vocals; Warren Ellis – violin, mandolin, flute, et al.	The Boatman's Call (1997); No More Shall We Part (2001); Nocturama (2003)
March 2003 – April 2008	Nick Cave – vocals, piano, organ, harmonica; Mick Harvey – guitar, piano, organ, backing vocals; Thomas Wydler – drums, percussion, backing vocals; Martyn P. Casey – bass, backing vocals; Conway Savage – piano, organ, backing vocals; Jim Sclavunos – percussion, drums, backing vocals; Warren Ellis – violin, mandolin, flute, et al.; James Johnston – guitar, organ, backing vocals	Abattoir Blues / The Lyre of Orpheus (2004); The Abattoir Blues Tour (2007); Dig, Lazarus, Dig!!! (2008)
April 2008 – January 2009	Nick Cave – vocals, piano, organ, harmonica; Mick Harvey – guitar, piano, organ, backing vocals; Thomas Wydler – drums, percussion, backing vocals; Martyn P. Casey – bass, backing vocals; Conway Savage – piano, organ, backing vocals; Jim Sclavunos – percussion, drums, backing vocals; Warren Ellis – violin, mandolin, flute, et al.	none
May – July 2009	Nick Cave – vocals, piano, organ, harmonica; Thomas Wydler – drums, percussion, backing vocals; Martyn P. Casey – bass, backing vocals; Conway Savage – piano, organ, backing vocals; Jim Sclavunos – percussion, drums, backing vocals; Warren Ellis – violin, guitar, synthesizers, et al.; Ed Kuepper – guitar (touring only)	none
July 2009 – January 2013	Nick Cave – vocals, piano, organ, harmonica; Thomas Wydler – drums, percussion, backing vocals; Martyn P. Casey – bass, backing vocals; Conway Savage – piano, organ, backing vocals; Jim Sclavunos – percussion, drums, backing vocals; Warren Ellis – violin, mandolin, flute, et al.	Push the Sky Away (2013)
February – April 2013	Nick Cave – vocals, piano, organ, harmonica; Martyn P. Casey – bass, backing vocals; Conway Savage – piano, organ, backing vocals; Jim Sclavunos – percussion, drums, backing vocals; Warren Ellis – violin, guitar, synthesizers, et al.; Barry Adamson – drums, keyboards, backing vocals; Ed Kuepper – guitar (touring only)	none
May 2013 – early 2015	Nick Cave – vocals, piano, organ, harmonica; Martyn P. Casey – bass, backing vocals; Conway Savage – piano, organ, backing vocals; Jim Sclavunos – drums, percussion, backing vocals; Warren Ellis – violin, guitar, synthesizers, et al.; Barry Adamson – organ, keyboards, percussion, backing vocals; George Vjestica – guitar, backing vocals	none
Early 2015 – May 2017	Nick Cave – vocals, piano, organ, harmonica; Thomas Wydler – drums, percussion, backing vocals; Martyn P. Casey – bass, backing vocals; Conway Savage – piano, organ, backing vocals (touring only); Jim Sclavunos – percussion, drums, backing vocals; Warren Ellis – violin, guitar, synthesizers, et al.; George Vjestica – guitar, backing vocals; Larry Mullins – keyboards, piano, percussion, backing vocals (touring only)	Skeleton Tree (2016)
May 2017 – October 2018	Nick Cave – vocals, piano, organ, harmonica; Thomas Wydler – drums, percussion, backing vocals; Martyn P. Casey – bass, backing vocals; Jim Sclavunos – percussion, drums, backing vocals; Warren Ellis – violin, guitar, synthesizers, et al.; George Vjestica – guitar, backing vocals; Larry Mullins – keyboards, piano, percussion, backing vocals (touring only)	Distant Sky: Live in Copenhagen (2018); Ghosteen (2019)
June 2022 – September 2024	Nick Cave – vocals, piano, organ, harmonica; Thomas Wylder – drums (session only); Martyn P. Casey – bass, backing vocals; Jim Sclavunos – percussion, drums, backing vocals; Warren Ellis – violin, guitar, synthesizers, et al.; George Vjestica – guitar, backing vocals; Larry Mullins – drums, percussion, backing vocals (touring only); Carly Paradis – keyboards (touring only); Janet Ramus - backing vocals (touring only); T Jae Cole - backing vocals (touring only); Subrina McCalla - backing vocals (touring only)	Wild God (2024)
September 2024 – present	Nick Cave – vocals, piano, organ, harmonica; Jim Sclavunos – percussion, drums, backing vocals; Warren Ellis – violin, guitar, synthesizers, et al.; George Vjestica – guitar, backing vocals; Larry Mullins – drums, percussion, backing vocals (touring only); Carly Paradis – keyboards (touring only); Janet Ramus - backing vocals (touring only); T Jae Cole - backing vocals (touring only); Miça Townsend – backing vocals (touring only); Wendi Rose – backing vocals (touring only); Colin Greenwood – bass (touring only)	
