= B-Sides & Rarities (Nick Cave and the Bad Seeds album) =

Compilation album by Nick Cave and the Bad Seeds
- Released: 22 March 2005
- Recorded: 1984–2004
- Genre: Rock
- Length: 218:36
- Label: Mute
- Producers: Nick Cave and the Bad Seeds; Flood; Tony Cohen; Gareth Jones; Victor Van Vugt; Nick Launay

Nick Cave and the Bad Seeds chronology
| Abattoir Blues / The Lyre of Orpheus (2004) | B-Sides & Rarities (2005) | The Abattoir Blues Tour (2007) |

Professional ratings
Aggregate scores
| Source | Rating |
|---|---|
| Metacritic | 75/100 |
Review scores
| Source | Rating |
| AllMusic | 3.5/5 stars |
| Blender | 3/5 stars |
| Drowned in Sound | (9/10) |
| Mojo | 3.5/5 stars |
| NME | (8/10) |
| Paste | (8/10) |
| Pitchfork | (7.8/10) |
| PopMatters | (6/10) |

B-Sides & Rarities is a compilation album by Nick Cave and the Bad Seeds, released in March 2005. It features over 20 years of the band's B-sides and previously unreleased tracks. It is also the first recording to include all members of the Bad Seeds, past and present up to the time of its release: current members Mick Harvey, Blixa Bargeld, Thomas Wydler, Martyn P. Casey, Conway Savage, Jim Sclavunos, and Warren Ellis, and former members Barry Adamson, Hugo Race, Kid Congo Powers, Roland Wolf, and James Johnston. A second volume, B-Sides & Rarities Part II, was released in October 2021.

== Content ==
In addition to the large number of B-sides that make up the majority of the compilation, the record includes two unreleased songs, two unreleased covers, as well as live and acoustic versions of Bad Seeds tracks.

Some of the tracks were originally released as Nick Cave solo tracks, namely "Helpless", "Cassiel's Song", the Shane MacGowan collaboration "What a Wonderful World", and "A Rainy Night in Soho".

== Critical reception ==
B-Sides & Rarities was met with "generally favorable" reviews from critics. At Metacritic, which assigns a weighted average rating out of 100 to reviews from mainstream publications, the release received an average score of 75, based on 17 reviews.

== Track listing ==
All songs written by Nick Cave unless otherwise stated.

=== Disc 1 ===
1. "Deanna" (Acoustic Version) – 2:51
  - Acoustic version of the song from "Tender Prey" (Recorded January 8th, 1990 at Fun City Studios). Attached as a bonus 7" to initial pressings of The Good Son album, 1990
2. "The Mercy Seat" (Acoustic Version) (lyrics: Cave; music: Cave, Harvey) - 3:45
  - Acoustic version of the song from "Tender Prey", (Recorded May 1989 at Hansa Ton Studios). Attached as a bonus 7" to initial pressings of The Good Son album, 1990
3. "City of Refuge" (Acoustic Version) – 2:42
  - Acoustic version of the song from "Tender Prey" (Recorded January 8th, 1990 at Fun City Studios). Attached as a bonus 7" to initial pressings of The Good Son album, 1990
4. "The Moon is in the Gutter" – 2:35
  - B-side of "In the Ghetto", 1984
5. "The Six Strings that Drew Blood" – 4:47
  - B-side of "Tupelo", 1985
6. "Rye Whiskey" (Traditional; arranged by Cave and Mick Harvey) - 3:27
  - Flexidisc in Reflex magazine in 1989
7. "Running Scared" (Roy Orbison, Joe Melson) - 2:06
  - B-side of "The Singer", 1986
8. "Black Betty" (Lead Belly) - 2:32
  - B-side of "The Singer", 1986
9. "Scum" (lyrics: Cave; music: Cave, Harvey) - 2:53
  - Flexidisc sold at concerts, 1986
10. "The Girl at the Bottom of My Glass" – 4:48
  - B-side of "Deanna" 12", 1988
11. "The Train Song" – 3:26
  - B-side of 'The Ship Song', 1990
12. "Cocks 'N' Asses" (lyrics: Cave; music: Cave, Victor Van Vugt) - 5:43
  - B-side of "The Weeping Song", 1990, retitled as "The B-Side Song" on the US single
13. "Blue Bird" – 2:46
  - B-side of "Straight to You/Jack the Ripper", 1992
14. "Helpless" (Neil Young) - 3:51
  - From Neil Young Tribute/Charity Album The Bridge, 1989. Also B-side of "The Weeping Song", 1990
15. "God's Hotel" – 3:07
  - Live Radio Session for KCRW Santa Monica. Released on Rare on Air Vol. 1, Mammoth Records, 1992
16. "(I'll Love You) Till the End of the World" – 3:58
  - From the original soundtrack Until the End of the World, 1991. Also B-side of "Loverman", 1994
17. "Cassiel's Song" – 3:35
  - From the original soundtrack Faraway, So Close, 1993. Also B-side of "Do You Love Me?", 1994
18. "Tower of Song" (Leonard Cohen) - 5:39
  - From Leonard Cohen tribute album I'm Your Fan, 1991
19. "What Can I Give You?" – 3:40
  - From the French promo give-away with Henry's Dream, 1992

=== Disc 2 ===
1. "What a Wonderful World" (George David Weiss, George Douglas) - 3:04
  - From the single "What a Wonderful World", 1992
2. "Rainy Night in Soho" (Shane MacGowan) - 3:58
  - Harvey & Bill McGee – String and woodwind arrangement
  - From the single "What a Wonderful World", 1992
3. "Lucy" (Version #2) – 2:23
  - From the single "What a Wonderful World", 1992
4. "Jack the Ripper" (Acoustic Version) – 4:45
  - B-side of the limited edition 7" "Straight to You/Jack the Ripper", 1992
5. "Sail Away" – 4:13
  - B-side of "Do You Love Me?", 1994
6. "There's No Night Out in the Jail" (John Harold Ashe) - 3:43
  - Recorded for a compilation of Australian country music cover versions which was never released, 1993
7. "That's What Jazz Is to Me" (lyrics: Cave; music: Cave, Harvey, Savage, Wydler) - 5:05
  - Improvised piece. B-side of "Red Right Hand", 1994
8. "The Willow Garden" (Traditional; arranged by Cave and Ellis) - 3:59
  - B-side of "Where the Wild Roses Grow", 1995
9. "The Ballad of Robert Moore and Betty Coltrane" – 3:35
  - B-side of "Where the Wild Roses Grow", 1995
10. "King Kong Kitchee Kitchee Ki-Mi-O" (Traditional; arranged by Cave) - 3:10
  - B-side of "Henry Lee", 1996
11. "Knoxville Girl" (Traditional; arranged by Cave and Johnston) - 3:36
  - B-side of "Henry Lee", 1996
12. "Where the Wild Roses Grow" – 3:47
  - Version with original guide vocal by Blixa Bargeld. Previously unreleased, 1995
13. "O'Malley's Bar Pt. 1" – 5:16
  - From Mark Radcliffe Radio 1 session, 1996
14. "O'Malley's Bar Pt. 2" – 6:38
  - From Mark Radcliffe Radio 1 session, 1996
15. "O'Malley's Bar Pt. 3" – 4:57
  - From Mark Radcliffe Radio 1 session, 1996
16. "Time Jesum Transeuntum et Non Riverentum" (lyrics: Cave; music: Cave, Ellis, Turner, White) - 6:22
  - Featuring The Dirty 3. Hidden track on X-Files album, 1996
17. "O'Malley's Bar Reprise" – 1:03
  - From Mark Radcliffe Radio 1 session, 1996
18. "Red Right Hand" (Scream 3 version) (lyrics: Cave; music: Cave, Harvey, Wydler) - 6:01
  - Recorded for the movie Scream 3. Previously unreleased, 1999

=== Disc 3 ===
1. "Little Empty Boat" (lyrics: Cave; music: Cave, Bargeld, Casey, Harvey) - 4:26
  - B-side of "Into My Arms", 1997
2. "Right Now I'm a-Roaming" (lyrics: Cave; music: Cave, Casey, Harvey, Savage, Wydler) - 4:21
  - B-side of "Into My Arms", 1997
3. "Come Into My Sleep" – 3:47
  - B-side of "(Are You) The One That I've Been Waiting For?", 1997
4. "Black Hair" (Band Version) – 4:13
  - B-side of "(Are You) The One That I've Been Waiting For?", 1997
5. "Babe, I Got You Bad" – 3:51
  - B-side of "(Are You) The One That I've Been Waiting For?", 1997
6. "Sheep May Safely Graze" – 4:14
  - Unreleased studio outtake, 1996
7. "Opium Tea" (Cave, Savage) - 3:48
  - Unreleased studio outtake, 1996
8. "Grief Came Riding" – 5:05
  - From limited edition of No More Shall We Part album, 2001
9. "Bless His Ever Loving Heart" – 4:02
  - From limited edition of No More Shall We Part album, 2001
10. "Good Good Day" – 4:04
  - B-side of "As I Sat Sadly By Her Side", 2001
11. "Little Janey's Gone" – 2:59
  - B-side of "As I Sat Sadly by Her Side", 2001
12. "I Feel So Good" (J. B. Lenoir) - 1:44
  - From the film The Soul of a Man by Wim Wenders, 2003
13. "Shoot Me Down" – 3:32
  - B-side of "Bring It On", 2003
14. "Swing Low" – 5:40
  - B-side of "Bring It On", 2003
15. "Little Ghost Song" – 3:44
  - B-side of "He Wants You/Babe, I'm On Fire", 2003
16. "Everything Must Converge" – 3:17
  - B-side of "He Wants You/Babe, I'm On Fire", 2003
17. "Nocturama" – 4:01
  - B-side of limited edition 7" "Rock of Gibraltar", 2003
18. "She's Leaving You" (lyrics: Cave; music: Cave, Ellis, Casey, Sclavunos) - 4:01
  - B-side of "Nature Boy", 2004
19. "Under This Moon" – 4:01
  - B-side of "Breathless/There She Goes, My Beautiful World", 2004

== Musicians ==
- Bronwyn Adams - backing vocals, violin
- Barry Adamson - bass, timpani, orchestral arrangements
- Blixa Bargeld - guitar, backing vocals, vocals, handclaps, slide guitar, pedal steel guitar, feedback guitar, percussion
- Martyn P. Casey - bass, backing vocals, percussion
- Nick Cave - vocals, piano, Hammond organ, harmonica, backing vocals, keyboards, whistling, guitar, string synth, sound effects
- Tony Cohen - backing vocals, percussion
- Kid Congo Powers - backing vocals, handclaps, slide guitar, tremolo guitar
- Terry Edwards - brass section
- Warren Ellis - violin, mandolin, bouzouki, looped violin
- Mick Gallagher - backing vocals
- Mick Harvey - guitar, backing vocals, acoustic guitar, bass, organ, drums, string arrangements, piano, Hammond organ, marimba, keyboards, sound effects, cymbals, vibes, xylophone, woodwind arrangement
- Chas Jankel - backing vocals
- James Johnston - organ, guitar
- Shane MacGowan - vocals
- Anna McGarrigle - backing vocals
- Kate McGarrigle - backing vocals
- Bill McGee - string arrangement, woodwind arrangement
- Astrid Munday - percussion
- Tracy Pew - bass
- Hugo Race - guitar
- Conway Savage - piano, organ, backing vocals, vocals, electric piano, Hammond organ, percussion
- Jim Sclavunos - drums, brushed snare, tambourine, percussion, tubular bells, organ, bongos, bells, shaker
- Johnny Turnbull - backing vocals
- Mick Turner - guitar
- Victor Van Vugt - drum machine
- Norman Watt-Roy - backing vocals
- Jim White - drums
- Roland Wolf - backing vocals, handclaps, piano
- Thomas Wydler - drums, percussion, backing vocals, tambourine, handclaps

=== Musicians by track ===
Disc 1

1. "Deanna" (acoustic version)
  - Cave – Vocals
  - Harvey – Guitar, backing vocals
  - Wydler – percussion
  - Congo Powers, Bargeld, Wolf – handclaps, backing vocals
2. "The Mercy Seat" (acoustic version)
  - Cave – vocals
  - Harvey – guitar, backing vocals
  - Wolf – piano
  - Bargeld – backing vocals
3. "City of Refuge" (acoustic version)
  - Cave – Vocals
  - Harvey – guitar, backing vocals
  - Bargeld, Wydler, Congo Powers, Wolf – handclaps, backing vocals
4. "The Moon is in the Gutter"
  - Cave – vocals, piano
  - Bargeld – guitar
  - Race – guitar
  - Adamson – bass
  - Harvey – drums
5. "The Six Strings that Drew Blood"
  - Cave – vocals, whistling
  - Harvey – Guitars, Bass, Keyboard
  - Bargeld – Feedback Guitar
6. "Rye Whiskey"
  - Cave – Vocals, Harmonica
  - Harvey – Acoustic Guitar, Drums
  - Race – Guitar
  - Tracy Pew – Bass
7. "Running Scared"
  - Cave – Vocals
  - Harvey – Drums, String Arrangement
  - Race – Guitar
  - Tracy Pew – Bass
8. "Black Betty"
  - Cave – Vocals
  - Harvey – Drums, Backing vocals
  - Bargeld – Backing vocals
9. "Scum" – 2:53
  - Cave – Vocals
  - Bargeld – Guitar
  - Harvey – Bass
  - Wydler – Drums
10. "The Girl at the Bottom of My Glass"
  - Cave – Vocals, Guitar, Backing vocals
  - Harvey – Drums, Backing vocals
  - Tony Cohen – Backing vocals
11. "The Train Song" – 3:26
  - Cave – Vocals, Piano
  - Harvey – Acoustic Guitar, Bass
  - Bargeld – Guitar
  - Congo Powers – Tremolo Guitar
  - Wydler – Drums
  - Harvey & Bill McGee – String Arrangement
12. "Cocks 'N' Asses"
  - Cave – Piano, Vocals, String Synth
  - Harvey – Guitar, Sound Effects
  - Victor Van Vugt – Drum Machine
13. "Blue Bird"
  - Cave – Vocals, Piano, Hammond organ
  - Harvey – Marimba
  - Casey – Bass
  - Wydler – Drums
14. "Helpless"
  - Cave – Vocals, Keyboard
  - Harvey – Acoustic Guitar, Bass, Organ, Drums, Backing vocals
  - Congo Powers – Slide Guitar
  - Bronwyn Adams – Backing vocals
15. "God's Hotel"
  - Cave – Vocals
  - Harvey – Acoustic Guitar
  - Bargeld – Slide Guitar
  - Savage – Piano
  - Casey – Bass
  - Wydler – Drums
16. "(I'll Love You) Till the End of the World"
  - Cave – Vocals, Piano
  - Bargeld – Guitar
  - Harvey – Acoustic Guitar, Bass, String Arrangement
  - Wydler – Drums
  - Bronwyn Adams – Violin
17. "Cassiel's Song"
  - Cave – Vocals, Piano
  - Adamson – Bass, Timpani
  - Harvey – String Arrangement
18. "Tower of Song"
  - Cave – Vocals
  - Harvey – Guitar
  - Bargeld – Guitar, Vocals
  - Casey – Bass
  - Wydler – Drums
19. "What Can I Give You?"
  - Cave – Vocals, Piano
  - Harvey – Acoustic Guitar
  - Savage – Electric Piano
  - Casey – Bass
  - Wydler – Drums

Disc 2

1. "What a Wonderful World"
  - Cave – Vocals
  - Shane MacGowan – Vocals
  - Harvey – Acoustic Guitar
  - Bargeld – Guitar
  - Savage – Piano
  - Casey – Bass
  - Wydler – Drums
  - Bill McGee – Woodwind Arrangement
2. "Rainy Night in Soho"
  - Cave – Vocals
  - Harvey – Acoustic Guitar, Vibes
  - Bargeld – Guitar
  - Savage – Piano
  - Casey – Bass
  - Wydler – Drums
  - Harvey & Bill McGee – String & Woodwind Arrangement
3. "Lucy" (Version #2)
  - MacGowan – Vocals
  - Cave – Piano, Backing vocals
  - Harvey & Bill McGee – String Arrangement
4. "Jack the Ripper" (acoustic version)
  - Cave – Vocals
  - Harvey – Acoustic Guitar
  - The Bad Seeds – Backing vocals, Percussion
5. "Sail Away"
  - Cave – Vocals, Hammond organ
  - Harvey – Marimba
  - Savage – Backing vocals
  - Casey – Bass
  - Wydler – Drums
6. "There's No Night Out in the Jail"
  - Cave – Vocals, Harmonica organ
  - Harvey – Organ, Guitar
  - Savage – Piano
  - Casey – Bass
  - Wydler – Drums
7. "That's What Jazz is to Me"
  - Cave – Vocals, Piano
  - Savage – Hammond organ
  - Harvey – Bass
  - Wydler – Drums
8. "The Willow Garden"
  - Savage – Vocals, Piano
  - Cave – Hammond organ
  - Ellis – Violin
  - Casey – Bass
  - Harvey – Cymbals
9. "The Ballad of Robert Moore and Betty Coltrane"
  - Cave – Vocals, Hammond organ, Piano, Sound Effects
  - Harvey – Acoustic Guitar
  - Casey – Bass
  - Wydler – Drums, Percussion
  - Terry Edwards – Brass Section
10. "King Kong Kitchee Kitchee Ki-Mi-O"
  - Cave – Vocals
  - Bargeld – Guitar
  - Ellis – Violin
  - Race – Guitar
  - Casey – Bass
  - Wydler – Drums
  - Sclavunos, Tony Cohen, Astrid Munday – Percussion
11. "Knoxville Girl"
  - Cave – Vocals
  - Johnston – Guitars
12. "Where the Wild Roses Grow"
  - Bargeld – Vocals, Guitar
  - Cave – Vocals, Piano
  - Harvey – Guitars, Backing vocals
  - Casey – Bass
  - Savage – Piano
  - Wydler – Drums
  - Sclavunos – Tubular Bells
13. "O'Malley's Bar Pt. 1"
  - Cave – Vocals
  - Harvey – Piano
  - Savage – Organ
  - Casey – Bass
  - Wydler – Drums
  - Sclavunos – Brushed Snare
14. "O'Malley's Bar Pt. 2"
  - Cave – Vocals
  - Harvey – Piano
  - Savage – Organ
  - Casey – Bass
  - Wydler – Drums
  - Sclavunos – Brushed Snare
15. "O'Malley's Bar Pt. 3"
  - Cave – Vocals
  - Harvey – Piano
  - Savage – Organ
  - Casey – Bass
  - Wydler – Drums
  - Sclavunos – Brushed Snare
16. "Time Jesum Transeuntum Et Non Riverentum"
  - Cave – Vocals, Piano
  - Ellis – Violin
  - Mick Turner – Guitar
  - Jim White – Drums
17. "O'Malley's Bar Reprise"
  - Cave – Vocals
  - Harvey – Piano
  - Savage – Organ
  - Casey – Bass
  - Wydler – Drums
  - Sclavunos – Brushed Snare
18. "Red Right Hand" (Scream 3 version)
  - Cave – Vocals, Hammond organ
  - Harvey – Guitar
  - Bargeld – Guitar
  - Casey – Bass
  - Wydler – Drums, Percussion
  - Adamson – Orchestral Arrangement

Disc 3

1. "Little Empty Boat"
  - Cave – Vocals, Piano
  - Harvey – Guitar, Organ
  - Bargeld – Guitar, Backing vocals
  - Casey – Bass, Backing vocals
  - Wydler – Drums, Backing vocals
  - Sclavunos – Percussion
  - Ellis – Looped Violin
2. "Right Now I'm A-Roaming"
  - Cave – Vocals, Keyboard
  - Harvey – Organ, Guitar, Backing vocals
  - Bargeld – Guitar, Backing vocals
  - Savage – Piano
  - Casey – Bass
  - Wydler – Drums
  - Sclavunos – Bells
3. "Come Into My Sleep"
  - Cave – Vocals
  - Harvey – Xylophone, Guitar, Organ
  - Bargeld – Guitar
  - Savage – Piano
  - Casey – Bass
  - Wydler – Drums
  - Sclavunos – Bongos
4. "Black Hair" (band version)
  - Cave – Vocals, Piano
  - Sclavunos – Organ
  - Casey – Bass
  - Wydler – Drums
5. "Babe, I Got You Bad"
  - Cave – Vocals
  - Harvey – Guitar, Organ
  - Bargeld – Guitar
  - Savage – Piano
  - Casey – Bass
  - Wydler – Drums
  - Sclavunos – Tambourine
6. "Sheep May Safely Graze"
  - Cave – Vocals
  - Harvey – Guitar
  - Bargeld – Guitar
  - Savage – Piano
  - Casey – Bass
7. "Opium Tea"
  - Cave – Vocals, Hammond organ
  - Savage – Piano
  - Casey – Bass
  - Wydler – Drums
8. "Grief Came Riding"
  - Cave – Vocals, Piano
  - Harvey – Guitar
  - Casey – Bass
  - Wydler – Drums
  - Kate & Anna McGarrigle – Backing vocals
9. "Bless His Ever Loving Heart"
  - Cave – Vocals, Piano
  - Harvey – Guitar
  - Ellis – Violin
  - Casey – Bass
  - Wydler – Drums
  - Kate & Anna McGarrigle – Backing vocals
10. "Good Good Day"
  - Cave – Vocals, Piano
  - Harvey – Guitar
  - Bargeld – Guitar
  - Casey – Bass
  - Wydler – Drums
  - Sclavunos – Tambourine
11. "Little Janey's Gone"
  - Cave – Vocals, Piano
  - Harvey – Guitar
  - Bargeld – Guitar
  - Ellis – Violin
  - Casey – Bass
  - Wydler – Drums
12. "I Feel So Good"
  - Cave – Vocals, Hammond organ
  - Harvey – Guitar, Backing vocals
  - Savage – Piano, Backing vocals
  - Sclavunos – Drums
13. "Shoot Me Down"
  - Cave – Vocals, Piano
  - Harvey – Guitar, Hammond organ
  - Ellis – Violin
  - Casey – Bass
  - Wydler – Drums
  - The Blockheads – Backing vocals
14. "Swing Low"
  - Cave – Vocals, Hammond organ
  - Harvey – Guitar, Hammond
  - Bargeld – Pedal Steel Guitar
  - Ellis – Violin
  - Casey – Bass
  - Wydler – Drums
  - Sclavunos – Tubular Bells, Tambourine
  - The Blockheads – Backing vocals
15. "Little Ghost Song"
  - Cave – Vocals, Piano, Hammond organ
  - Savage – Vocal
  - Harvey – Guitar, Backing vocals
  - Bargeld – Guitar
  - Ellis – Violin
  - Casey – Bass
  - Wydler – Drums
16. "Everything Must Converge"
  - Cave – Vocals, Hammond organ, Harmonica
  - Bargeld – Guitar
  - Harvey – Bass
  - Sclavunos – Drums
  - The Blockheads – Backing vocals
17. "Nocturama"
  - Cave – Vocals
  - Harvey – Guitar
  - Bargeld – Guitar
  - Savage – Organ
  - Casey – Bass
  - Wydler – Drums
  - Sclavunos – Shaker
  - The Blockheads – Backing vocals
18. "She's Leaving You"
  - Cave – Vocals, Piano
  - Harvey – Guitar
  - Ellis – Bouzouki
  - Johnston – Organ
  - Savage – Piano
  - Casey – Bass
  - Sclavunos – Drums
  - Wydler – Tambourine
19. "Under This Moon"
  - Cave – Vocals, Piano
  - Harvey – Guitar
  - Ellis – Mandolin
  - Johnston – Organ
  - Casey – Bass
  - Sclavunos – Drums
  - Wydler – Tambourine

== Charts ==
Chart performance for B-Sides & Rarities
| Chart (2005) | Peak position |
|---|---|
| UK Albums (Official Charts) | 74 |
| Chart (2021) | Peak position |
| Scottish Albums (Official Charts) | 33 |
| UK Independent Albums (Official Charts) | 12 |
