= Live at the Royal Albert Hall (Nick Cave and The Bad Seeds album) =

Live album by Nick Cave and the Bad Seeds
- Released: 24 November 2008
- Recorded: May 1997
- Venue: Royal Albert Hall
- Length: 56:37

Nick Cave and the Bad Seeds chronology
Dig, Lazarus, Dig!!! (2008)	Live at the Royal Albert Hall (2008)	Push the Sky Away (2013)

Live at the Royal Albert Hall is a live album by the Australian rock band Nick Cave and the Bad Seeds, released on 24 November 2008. It was recorded at the Royal Albert Hall in London on 19 and 20 May 1997 during the tour for The Boatman's Call and eight of these tracks (plus a version of "The Weeping Song") were originally released as a nine-track bonus disc for The Best of Nick Cave and The Bad Seeds.

The live album features a version of "Where the Wild Roses Grow" with vocals by Blixa Bargeld, similar to the demo version that was included on the B-Sides & Rarities album. The live recordings display the more mellow sound and performances that the group had been showcasing during the mid- and late-1990s, and would continue to deliver on the later No More Shall We Part album.

Professional ratings
Review scores
Source	Rating
AllMusic	3/5 stars

== Track listing ==
All tracks are written by Nick Cave, except where noted.

No.	Title	Writer(s)	Length
1.	"Lime Tree Arbour"		3:41
2.	"Stranger than Kindness"	Anita Lane, Blixa Bargeld	5:03
3.	"Red Right Hand"	Nick Cave, Mick Harvey, Thomas Wydler	5:18
4.	"I Let Love In"		4:12
5.	"Brompton Oratory"		3:47
6.	"Henry Lee"	Cave, Traditional	4:03
7.	"The Ship Song"		4:15
8.	"Where the Wild Roses Grow"		4:12
9.	"People Ain't No Good"		6:11
10.	"Do You Love Me?"	Cave, Martyn P. Casey	4:31
11.	"Far From Me"		6:12
12.	"The Mercy Seat"	Cave, Harvey	5:12
Total length:			56:37

Note: Tracks 9, 10, 11 and 12 were not included on The Best of Nick Cave and The Bad Seeds bonus disc.

== Personnel ==
- Nick Cave – vocals
- Warren Ellis – violin
- Blixa Bargeld – guitars, vocals
- Mick Harvey – guitars, organ, vibraphone
- Conway Savage – piano, organ
- Martyn Casey – bass
- Thomas Wydler – drums
- Jim Sclavunos – percussion
