= From Her to Eternity (song) =

Song by Nick Cave and the Bad Seeds

from the album From Her to Eternity
- Released: 18 June 1984
- Recorded: March 1984
- Studio: Trident (London)
- Genre: Post-punk; noise rock; experimental rock
- Length: 5:33
- Label: Mute
- Songwriters: Barry Adamson; Blixa Bargeld; Nick Cave; Mick Harvey; Anita Lane; Hugo Race
- Producer: Flood

Official audio
- "From Her to Eternity" on YouTube

"From Her to Eternity" is a song by the Australian rock band Nick Cave and the Bad Seeds appearing on their debut studio album From Her to Eternity (1984). The lyrics were written by Nick Cave and Anita Lane, with the music written by Cave, Barry Adamson, Blixa Bargeld, Mick Harvey and Hugo Race and it was recorded in March 1984 at Trident Studios in London, England.

Mat Snow described the song as an "epic starring the most icy scalpel of a piano motif ever to cut to the heart of trauma. And backing it up is an arsenal of breakdown, electrocution and massacre that rises and rises again in the multiple orgasm of a man torturing himself to death."

== Accolades ==
| Year | Publication | Country | Accolade | Rank |
|---|---|---|---|---|
| 2011 | Treble | United States | The Top 200 Songs of the 80s | 144 |
| 2012 | Consequence | United States | The 100 Greatest Songs of All Time | 96 |

== Personnel ==
Adapted from the From Her to Eternity liner notes.

Nick Cave and the Bad Seeds

- Nick Cave – lead vocals; Hammond organ
- Blixa Bargeld – electric guitar
- Hugo Race – electric guitar
- Barry Adamson – bass guitar
- Mick Harvey – drums; piano; vibraphone

Production and additional personnel

- Flood – production; engineering
- Tim Young – mastering

== See also ==
- Nick Cave and the Bad Seeds discography
