= B-Sides & Rarities Part II =

Compilation album by Nick Cave and the Bad Seeds
- Released: 22 October 2021
- Recorded: 2006–2019
- Label: Mute

Nick Cave and the Bad Seeds chronology
Idiot Prayer: Nick Cave Alone at Alexandra Palace (2020)	B-Sides & Rarities Part II (2021)	Wild God (2024)

Professional ratings
Review scores
Source	Rating
Pitchfork	8.0/10

B-Sides & Rarities Part II is a compilation album by Nick Cave and the Bad Seeds, released on 22 October 2021. It is the sequel to the band's 2005 compilation B-Sides & Rarities and features 13 years of the band's B-sides and previously unreleased tracks spanning the years 2006–2019.

== Content ==
The collection features the original versions of the songs "Skeleton Tree" and "Girl in Amber" from the album Skeleton Tree as well as "Bright Horses" and "Waiting for You" from Ghosteen before they were re-written and re-recorded in their final album versions. Some of the tracks were credited to Nick Cave alone upon their original release, such as "Free to Walk" and "Avalanche".

== Track listing ==
All tracks are written by Nick Cave and Warren Ellis, except where noted.

Disc 1
No.	Title	Writer(s)	Originally appears on:	Length
1.	"Hey Little Firing Squad"	Nick Cave	"Midnight Man" single (2008)	4:00
2.	"Fleeting Love"		"More News From Nowhere" single (2008)	4:18
3.	"Accidents Will Happen"	Cave	"Dig, Lazarus, Dig!!!" single (2008)	4:19
4.	"Free to Walk" (featuring Debbie Harry)	Jeffrey Lee Pierce	We Are Only Riders: The Jeffrey Lee Pierce Sessions Project (2010)	3:08
5.	"Avalanche"	Leonard Cohen	New version recorded for season two of the television series Black Sails, 2015	4:34
6.	"Vortex"	Cave, Warren Ellis, Martyn P. Casey, Jim Sclavunos	Previously unreleased studio outtake, 2006	4:38
7.	"Needle Boy"		"Needle Boy" single (2013)	3:54
8.	"Lightning Bolts"	Cave, Ellis, Thomas Wydler	"Needle Boy" single (2013)	3:49
9.	"Animal X"	Cave, Ellis, Wydler	"Animal X" single (2013)	3:51
10.	"Give Us a Kiss"		"Give Us a Kiss" single (2014)	3:34
11.	"Push the Sky Away" (live with the Melbourne Symphony Orchestra)		Previously unreleased live recording	5:20

Disc 2
No.	Title	Writer(s)	Originally appears on:	Length
1.	"First Skeleton Tree"	Cave	Previously unreleased studio outtake, 2013/2014	3:05
2.	"King Sized Nick Cave Blues"	Cave	Previously unreleased studio outtake, 2013/2014	3:53
3.	"Opium Eyes"		Previously unreleased studio outtake, 2013/2014	2:27
4.	"Big Dream (With Sky)"		Previously unreleased studio outtake, 2018/2019	3:27
5.	"Instrumental #33"		Previously unreleased studio outtake, 2013/2014	2:26
6.	"Hell Villanelle"		Previously unreleased studio outtake, 2013/2014	3:49
7.	"Euthanasia"	Cave	Previously unreleased studio outtake, 2013/2014	2:47
8.	"Life Per Se"		Previously unreleased studio outtake, 2013/2014	2:59
9.	"Steve McQueen"		Previously unreleased studio outtake, 2013/2014	3:49
10.	"First Bright Horses"		Previously unreleased studio outtake, 2018/2019	2:35
11.	"First Girl in Amber"		Previously unreleased studio outtake, 2013/2014	2:59
12.	"Glacier"		Previously unreleased studio outtake, 2011/2012	2:39
13.	"Heart That Kills You"		Previously unreleased studio outtake, 2018/2019	3:05
14.	"First Waiting for You"		Previously unreleased studio outtake, 2018/2019	1:41
15.	"Sudden Song"		Previously unreleased studio outtake, 2013/2014	1:41
16.	"Earthlings"		Previously unreleased studio outtake, 2018/2019	3:00

== Charts ==
Chart performance for B-Sides & Rarities Part II
Chart (2021)	Peak position
Australian Albums (ARIA)	38
Austrian Albums (Ö3 Austria)	16
Belgian Albums (Ultratop Flanders)	8
Belgian Albums (Ultratop Wallonia)	39
Dutch Albums (Album Top 100)	17
Finnish Albums (Suomen virallinen lista)	18
German Albums (Offizielle Top 100)	19
Irish Albums (IRMA)	91
Italian Albums (FIMI)	50
Polish Albums (ZPAV)	45
Scottish Albums (Official Charts)	11
Spanish Albums (Promusicae)	76
Swiss Albums (Schweizer Hitparade)	11
UK Albums (Official Charts)	27
UK Independent Albums (Official Charts)	3
