= Abattoir Blues / The Lyre of Orpheus =

Studio album by Nick Cave and the Bad Seeds
- Released: September 20, 2004
- Recorded: March–April 2004
- Studios: Studio Ferber in Paris, France
- Genres: Gothic rock; blues rock; gospel rock
- Length: 82:30
- Label: Mute
- Producers: Nick Launay, Nick Cave and the Bad Seeds

Nick Cave and the Bad Seeds chronology
Nocturama (2003)	Abattoir Blues / The Lyre of Orpheus (2004)	B-Sides & Rarities (2005)

Singles from Abattoir Blues / The Lyre of Orpheus
- 1. "Nature Boy" Released: 6 September 2004; 2. "Breathless / There She Goes, My Beautiful World" Released: 15 November 2004; 3. "Get Ready for Love" Released: 14 March 2005

Abattoir Blues / The Lyre of Orpheus is the thirteenth studio album by the Australian alternative rock band Nick Cave and the Bad Seeds, released on 20 September 2004 on Mute Records. It is a double album of seventeen songs.

Released to critical acclaim, the album reached the top 10 in thirteen countries, largely in Europe. Pitchfork named it the 180th-best album of the 2000s, and it found inclusion in the book 1001 Albums You Must Hear Before You Die.

== History ==
The album was produced by Nick Launay at Studio Ferber in Paris in March–April 2004 and Nick Cave used The Bad Seeds line up of Mick Harvey, Thomas Wydler, Martyn Casey, Conway Savage, Jim Sclavunos, Warren Ellis, and James Johnston. It was the first album by the group for which Blixa Bargeld did not perform – English guitarist and organist Johnston, of the group Gallon Drunk, replaced Bargeld. Cave decided to split drumming duties for the two parts, with Sclavunos on Abattoir Blues and Wydler on The Lyre of Orpheus. According to Launay, the whole album was completed in twelve days. The song "Let the Bells Ring", was a posthumous tribute to Johnny Cash.

The album also made prominent use of a gospel choir, which Cave credited with adding another dimension to his sound. "With a voice like mine, the choir adds a levity to the whole thing that I can't do on my own."

The album's release was supported by the Abattoir Blues Tour, which travelled through Europe from 2 November to 5 December. In January 2007 a double live album and DVD was issued as The Abattoir Blues Tour. Abattoir Blues / The Lyre of Orpheus's last track, "O Children", was featured in the 2010 film Harry Potter and the Deathly Hallows – Part 1, and the song is referenced as an achievement in Lego Harry Potter: Years 5–7. In March 2005, to complement the success of the double album, Nick Cave and the Bad Seeds released B-Sides & Rarities, a three-disc, 56-track collection of B-sides, rarities, and tracks that had appeared on film soundtracks.

== Critical reception ==
Professional ratings
Aggregate scores
Source	Rating
Metacritic	88/100
Review scores
Source	Rating
AllMusic	4.5/5 stars
Blender	4/5 stars
Entertainment Weekly	A−
The Guardian	5/5 stars
Mojo	5/5 stars
NME	9/10
Pitchfork	7.8/10 (1) (2004); 7.4/10 (2) (2004); 9.0/10 (2012)
Q	4/5 stars
Rolling Stone	3/5 stars
Spin	B

Abattoir Blues / The Lyre of Orpheus holds a score of 88 out of 100 from Metacritic, indicating "universal acclaim". Susan Carpenter of the Los Angeles Times described the album as "a bounty of gothic rock" and noted that "the more driving, menacing numbers have been separated from the slow and scurrilous in a double album that is not two-halves of a whole so much as two distinct records released simultaneously and in one package." Thom Jurek of AllMusic described Abattoir Blues as "a rock & roll record... a pathos-drenched, volume-cranked rocker, full of crunch, punishment – and taste" and The Lyre of Orpheus as "a much quieter, more elegant affair... more consciously restrained, its attention to craft and theatrical flair more prevalent.". Greg Simpson of Punknews.org said that Abattoir Blues "is very bluesy indeed, a rock and roll album with many angry songs and booming bass lines," while The Lyre of Orpheus "insists on being a separate album, due to its completely different more gentle feel." Dan Lawrence of Stereogum ranked the album at fifth in their list of best albums in Cave's discography, and described it musically as "riotous gospel rock".

In a rave review, Tiny Mix Tapes critic Grigsby wrote that while Abattoir Blues / The Lyre of Orpheus "may not be the best beginner's guide" to the band, for "anyone who is a fan of the duration of his career, this album rewards the listener with a bit of the best of everything he has to offer." Paste said: "Aside from the power of the music and lyrics, the set draws on Cave's compelling persona: part priest, part sideshow barker--crooning one moment and eviscerating the next. While this has always been the core of his talent, on Abattoir/Lyre it is particularly rich and rewarding." In a more mixed assessment, Douglas Wolk, writing in Spin, was complimentary of Abattoir Blues but felt that The Lyre of Orpheus was "effectively Abattoir spillover: more mellow, less grand in conception, but—somehow—more pretentious in execution." In his Consumer Guide for The Village Voice, Robert Christgau designated three songs from the album ("The Lyre of Orpheus", "There She Goes, My Beautiful World", and "Hiding All Away") as "choice cuts", indicating good songs "on an album that isn't worth your time or money".

Pitchfork named Abattoir Blues / The Lyre of Orpheus the 180th-best album of the 2000s. It was also included in the book 1001 Albums You Must Hear Before You Die.

== Track listing ==
All tracks are written by Nick Cave unless otherwise noted.

Disc one: Abattoir Blues
No.	Title	Writer(s)	Length
1.	"Get Ready for Love"	Nick Cave, Warren Ellis, Martyn P. Casey, Jim Sclavunos	5:05
2.	"Cannibal's Hymn"		4:54
3.	"Hiding All Away"		6:31
4.	"Messiah Ward"		5:14
5.	"There She Goes, My Beautiful World"		5:17
6.	"Nature Boy"	Cave, Ellis, Casey, Sclavunos	4:54
7.	"Abattoir Blues"	Cave, Ellis	3:58
8.	"Let the Bells Ring"	Cave, Ellis	4:26
9.	"Fable of the Brown Ape"		2:45
Total length:			43:05

Disc two: The Lyre of Orpheus
No.	Title	Writer(s)	Length
1.	"The Lyre of Orpheus"	Cave, Ellis, Casey, Sclavunos	5:36
2.	"Breathless"		3:13
3.	"Babe, You Turn Me On"		4:21
4.	"Easy Money"		6:43
5.	"Supernaturally"		4:37
6.	"Spell"	Cave, Ellis, Casey, Sclavunos	4:25
7.	"Carry Me"		3:37
8.	"O Children"		6:51
Total length:			39:25

== Personnel ==
All personnel credits adapted from Abattoir Blues / The Lyre of Orpheus's liner notes.

Nick Cave and the Bad Seeds

- Nick Cave – vocals, piano, production, mixing
- Mick Harvey – guitar, production, mixing
- Warren Ellis – violin, mandolin, bouzouki, flute, production, mixing
- Martyn P. Casey – bass, production
- Conway Savage – piano, production
- James Johnston – organ, production
- Jim Sclavunos – drums on Abattoir Blues, percussion, production
- Thomas Wydler – drums on The Lyre of Orpheus, percussion, production

Guest musicians

- Åse Bergstrøm – backing vocals
- Donovan Lawrence – backing vocals
- Geo Onayomake – backing vocals

Guest musicians (continued)

- Lena Palmer – backing vocals
- Stephanie Meade – backing vocals
- Wendy Rose – backing vocals

Technical personnel

- Nick Launay – producer, engineer, mixing
- Lars Fox – digital audio editor
- Ian Cooper – mastering

Design personnel

- Tom Hingston – design, artwork
- David Hughes – photography
- Delphine Ciampi – photography

== Charts ==
Chart (2004)	Peak position
Australian Albums (ARIA)	5
Austrian Albums (Ö3 Austria)	2
Belgian Albums Chart (Vl)	4
Belgian Albums Chart (Wa)	14
Danish Albums (Hitlisten)	2
Dutch Albums (Album Top 100)	7
Finnish Albums (Suomen virallinen lista)	6
French Albums (SNEP)	19
German Albums Chart	7
Greek Albums Chart	1
Irish Albums Chart	4
Italian FIMI Albums Chart	3
New Zealand Albums (RMNZ)	11
Norwegian Albums (VG-lista)	1
Portuguese AFP Albums Chart	4
Swedish Albums (Sverigetopplistan)	3
Swiss Albums (Schweizer Hitparade)	12
UK Albums Chart	11
US Billboard 200	126
US Independent Albums (Billboard)	10
US Indie Store Album Sales (Billboard)	2

== Certifications ==
Region	Certification	Certified units/sales
Australia (ARIA)	Gold	35,000^{^}
Greece (IFPI Greece)	Gold	10,000^{^}
United Kingdom (BPI)	Gold	100,000^{^}
^{^} Shipments figures based on certification alone.
