= Original Seeds =

Original Seeds: Songs that inspired Nick Cave and the Bad Seeds

Compilation album by Various artists
- Released: 22 June 1998
- Length: 59:00
- Labels: Rubber; BMG
- Producer: Kim Beissel

Various artists chronology
Original Seeds: Songs that inspired Nick Cave and the Bad Seeds (1998)	Original Seeds: Songs that inspired Nick Cave and the Bad Seeds, Vol 2 (2004)

Original Seeds: Songs that inspired Nick Cave and the Bad Seeds is a various artist compilation, which was initially released in June 1998. It was re-titled as Original Seeds Volume 1: Songs That Inspired Nick Cave and the Bad Seeds when the follow-up Original Seeds Volume 2: Songs That Inspired Nick Cave and the Bad Seeds appeared in 2004. Both appeared on the Rubber Records label in Australia and the United Kingdom.

The liner notes by the producer, Kim Beissel, describe the link between each track and works by Australian musician, Nick Cave, generally with his group, the Bad Seeds throughout their related careers. Most tracks were directly covered by Cave, while some were adapted, or borrowed from, to form new songs.

In January 2009 Beissel appeared as a DJ at the Cave-curated festival, All Tomorrow's Parties at Mount Buller, Australia.

In 2019, Cave curated a Spotify playlist "Nick Cave's Hidden Songs" which included the original artist's recordings of "Avalanche", "Katie Cruel", "Tupelo Blues", and "Plain Gold Ring", as well as songs by Bob Dylan, Van Morrison, Neil Young and others.

== Inspirations ==
While the liner notes reference many songs, the songs included on each CD that Beissel claims partly inspired new Cave songs are as follows:

Volume 1 – "Katie Cruel" ("When I First Came to Town"), "Tupelo Blues" ("Tupelo"), "Another Man Done Gone" ("The Good Son"), "I’m Gonna Run to the City of Refuge" ("City of Refuge"), "Oh Happy Day" ("Deanna")

Volume 2 – "Way Down in the Hole" ("Red Right Hand"), "Sara" ("Where Do We Go Now But Nowhere?"), "Perfect Day" ("There is a Kingdom"), "Street Fight" ("Hamlet (Pow, Pow, Pow)").

== Reception ==
=== Critical reception ===
Professional ratings
Review scores
Source	Rating
Rolling Stone	4/5 stars
The Age	4/4 stars

Both volumes received positive critical reactions. Of Volume 1, in September 1998 Tracey Grimson of Australian Rolling Stone gave the album four stars, writing "Altogether stunning...a journey through music's flirtation with death, love and the rest.". Patrick Donovan of The Age gave the album four stars and declared it "Album of the week" (24/07/1998), stating "the presentation is faultless". Of Volume 2, Noel Mengel of The Courier Mail wrote "An album of startling contrasts...plays like a dream radio station" (09/10/2004); Michael Dwyer of The Age called it "An inspired work of cultural archaeology" (02/10/2004); Stephen Fitzpatrick of The Weekend Australian called it "The perfect journey through pop's wilderness" (23/10/2004); Malena Rydell of Dagens Nyheter (Daily News, Sweden) wrote "A bunch of truly fantastic tracks" (01/12/2004).

== Track listing ==
Original Seeds: Songs that inspired Nick Cave and the Bad Seeds
No.	Title	Writer(s)	Artist	Length
1.	"Long Time Man"	Tim Rose	Tim Rose	5:04
2.	"Cat Man"	Gene Vincent, William "Sheriff Tex" Davis	Gene Vincent & the Blue Caps	2:17
3.	"Avalanche"	Leonard Cohen	Leonard Cohen	5:00
4.	"Katie Cruel"	Traditional	Karen Dalton	2:20
5.	"Hammer Song"	Alex Harvey	The Sensational Alex Harvey Band	4:05
6.	"Weeping Annaleah"	Mickey Newbury, Dan Folger	Tom Jones	3:24
7.	"Sad Dark Eyes"	Gerry Humphrys, Rob Lovett, Ian Clyne, Gavin Anderson	The Loved Ones	2:14
8.	"The Big Hurt"	Wayne Shanklin	Scott Walker	2:23
9.	"Tupelo Blues"	John Lee Hooker	John Lee Hooker	3:23
10.	"The Long Black Veil"	Danny Dill, Marijohn Wilkin	Lefty Frizzell	3:09
11.	"The Folk Singer"	Johnny Cash, Charlie Daniels	Johnny Cash	2:58
12.	"Another Man Done Gone"	Traditional	Odetta	2:09
13.	"I'm Gonna Run to the City of Refuge"	Traditional	Blind Willie Johnson	3:23
14.	"Oh Happy Day"	Traditional	Edwin Hawkins Singers	5:08
15.	"Je t'aime... moi non plus"	Serge Gainsbourg	Serge Gainsbourg and Jane Birkin	4:22
16.	"By the Time I Get to Phoenix"	Jimmy Webb	Isaac Hayes	18:40

=== Volume two ===
No.	Title	Writer(s)	Artist	Length
1.	"Did You Hear About Jerry?"	Harry Belafonte, Irving Burgie	Harry Belafonte	2:56
2.	"Way Down in the Hole"	Tom Waits	Tom Waits	3:30
3.	"A Little Bit of Rain"	Fred Neil	Fred Neil	2:24
4.	"Love Like Anthrax"	Dave Allen, Hugo Burnham, Andy Gill, Jon King	Gang of Four	3:19
5.	"Sara"	Bob Dylan	Bob Dylan	5:31
6.	"Hey Joe"	Billy Roberts	Tim Rose	3:03
7.	"Just Dropped In (To See What Condition My Condition Was In)"	Mickey Newbury	The First Edition	3:22
8.	"In The Ghetto"	Mac Davis	Elvis Presley	2:47
9.	"Plain Gold Ring"	George Stone	Nina Simone	3:56
10.	"Loose"	The Stooges	The Stooges	3:33
11.	"Looky Looky Yonder/Black Betty/Yellow Women's Door Bells"	Traditional; arranged by Huddie Ledbetter	Lead Belly	3:00
12.	"Double Dare"	Hoyt Axton	Hoyt Axton	2:32
13.	"Perfect Day"	Lou Reed	Lou Reed	3:46
14.	"Street Fight"	Alice Cooper, Glen Buxton, Michael Bruce, Dennis Dunaway, Neal Smith	Alice Cooper	0:55

== Sources ==
- Original Seeds: Songs that inspired Nick Cave & the Bad Seeds, Kim Beissel, CD liner notes, Rubber Records Australia, 1998
- Original Seeds Vol. 2: Songs that inspired Nick Cave & the Bad Seeds, Kim Beissel, CD liner notes, Rubber Records Australia, 2004
