= George Vjestica =

British guitarist and songwriter (born 1967)

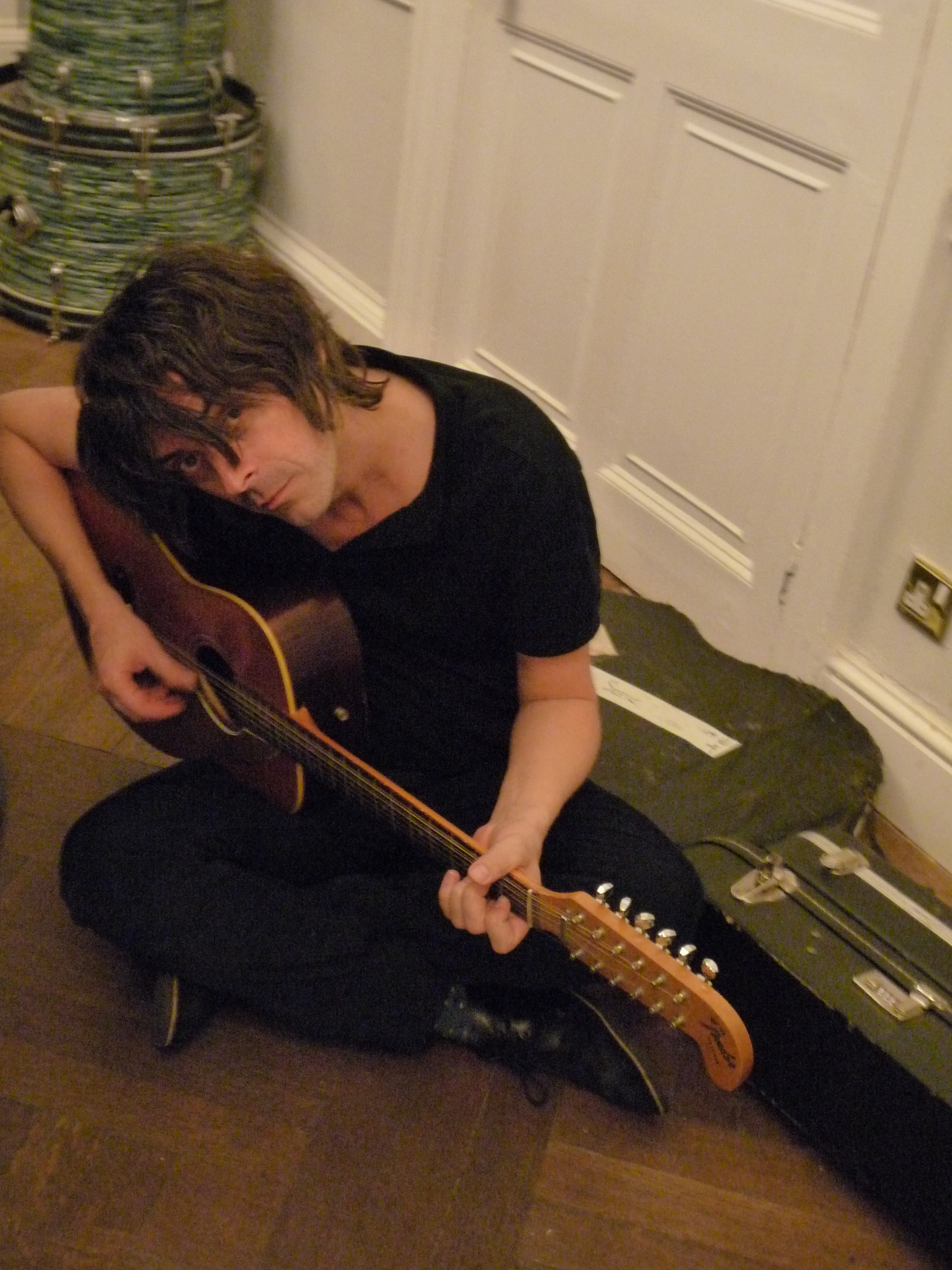
- George Vjestica rehearsing in 2013

Background information
- Born: 2 May 1967 (age 59); Stoke-on-Trent, Staffordshire, England
- Origin: Newcastle-under-Lyme, Staffordshire, England
- Genres: Alternative rock; electronica; house
- Occupations: Musician; songwriter
- Instruments: Guitar; vocals; piano
- Years active: 1993–present
- Member of: Nick Cave and the Bad Seeds,

George Vjestica is a British guitarist and songwriter. He is best known as a member of Nick Cave and the Bad Seeds, whom he joined in 2013. Outside of his work with Cave, Vjestica has collaborated with Groove Armada, John Squire and KT Tunstall across his career and fronts the band Bandante.

Prior to joining Nick Cave & the Bad Seeds as a full contributing member, Vjestica worked with Nick Cave and Warren Ellis on their film soundtracks for The Proposition and Lawless. Vjestica subsequently contributed to the Bad Seeds' fifteenth studio album, Push the Sky Away (2013), and joined the band on its accompanying tour. Vjestica has remained in the band ever since, contributing to the albums, Skeleton Tree (2016), Ghosteen (2019) and Wild God (2024).

Vjestica worked with the director Lynne Ramsay on the music for her 2025 film, Die My Love, starring Robert Pattinson and Jennifer Lawrence.

== Career ==
From 2006 to 2010 Vjestica toured and recorded with Groove Armada, appearing on albums, Black Light and Soundboy Rock.

He has also toured with John Squire (Stone Roses), appearing on the Marshall's House album, and played guitar on KT Tunstall's debut EP False Alarm which features on the multi-million selling album Eye to the Telescope.

Although best known for his guitar work in various bands, Vjestica has released one double-sided single, "Bang Bang/She Put a Spell in Me".

== Personal life ==
George Vjestica was born and grew up in Stoke-on-Trent, Staffordshire, England to Croatian Serb parents Nikola and Marta Vještica (died on 31 January 2021) from Lika, Croatia.

In 2009, Vjestica married the writer Rosie Mortimer with whom he has two sons.
