= Nocturama (album) =

Studio album by Nick Cave and the Bad Seeds
- Released: 3 February 2003
- Recorded: March 2002
- Studio: SingSing Melbourne
- Genre: Alternative rock
- Length: 57:35
- Labels: Mute, Anti-
- Producers: Nick Cave and the Bad Seeds, Nick Launay

Nick Cave and the Bad Seeds chronology
| No More Shall We Part (2001) | Nocturama (2003) | Abattoir Blues / The Lyre of Orpheus (2004) |

Singles from Nocturama
- 1. "Bring It On" Released: 24 February 2003; 2. "He Wants You" / "Babe, I'm on Fire" Released: 2 June 2003; 3. "Rock of Gibraltar" Released: 1 September 2003

Professional ratings
Aggregate scores
| Source | Rating |
|---|---|
| Metacritic | 73/100 |
Review scores
| Source | Rating |
| AllMusic | 2.5/5 stars |
| Alternative Press | 5/5 |
| Blender | 4/5 stars |
| The Guardian | 3/5 stars |
| Los Angeles Times | 3/4 stars |
| NME | 8/10 |
| Pitchfork | 7.0/10 |
| Q | 3/5 stars |
| Rolling Stone | 3/5 stars |
| Uncut | 3/5 stars |

Nocturama is the twelfth studio album by Nick Cave and the Bad Seeds, released on February 3, 2003, on Mute and ANTI-. Produced by Nick Launay, the album is the last with founding member Blixa Bargeld.

== Recording ==
Nocturama was recorded in one week during an Australian tour in March 2002, and reunited Nick Cave and guitarist Mick Harvey with producer Nick Launay, who had worked with their previous band the Birthday Party 21 years earlier.

Reflecting on the recording experience, Launay noted: "I'll never forget the first day recording Nocturama. Blixa swept into SingSing Studio in that hat. Mick Harvey introduces me and Blixa goes, 'Oh, ja, the engineer.' Mick says, 'No, Blixa – the producer.' Blixa says, 'Well, we'll see about that, won't we?' From a distance they look like the most chaotic band. From an engineering point of view, it's just fucking mental – like recording a live gig but you're capturing this thing for ever. As soon as Nick walks in and sits at the piano, you're recording. The intensity is unlike any other band."

== Reviews ==
The album received positive reviews, varying between highly positive (5/5 from Alternative Press and "CD of the week" in the Evening Standard) to moderately positive (3/5 from Q, Rolling Stone, and Uncut). Many of the reviewers pointed out the quality of the final track, "Babe, I'm on Fire", which in the words of John Aizlewood (writing for Evening Standard) is a "rip-roaring, tongue-twisting, 15-minute keyboard-led stomp, reminiscent of Dylan at his most coruscating. It's innovative eyebrow-raising and supremely disciplined--like Cave himself."

== Track listing ==
All tracks are written by Nick Cave.

| No. | Title | Length |
|---|---|---|
| 1. | "Wonderful Life" | 6:49 |
| 2. | "He Wants You" | 3:30 |
| 3. | "Right Out of Your Hand" | 5:15 |
| 4. | "Bring It On" | 5:22 |
| 5. | "Dead Man in My Bed" | 4:40 |
| 6. | "Still in Love" | 4:44 |
| 7. | "There Is a Town" | 4:58 |
| 8. | "Rock of Gibraltar" | 3:00 |
| 9. | "She Passed by My Window" | 3:20 |
| 10. | "Babe, I'm on Fire" | 14:45 |
| Total length: | | 57:35 |

== Singles ==
- "Bring It On" (MUTE 265) (February 24, 2003)
  - "Bring It On" (Edit) b/w: "Shoot Me Down" / "Swing Low"
- "He Wants You" / "Babe, I'm on Fire" (MUTE 290) (June 2, 2003)
  - "He Wants You" (Edit) / "Babe, I'm on Fire" (Edit) b/w: "Little Ghost Song" / "Everything Must Converge"
- "Rock of Gibraltar" (MUTE 318) (September 1, 2003)
  - b/w: "Nocturama"

== Personnel ==
Nick Cave and the Bad Seeds

- Nick Cave – Vocals (1–10), Piano (1–3, 5–8, 10), Hammond (1, 4–8, 10)
- Mick Harvey – Guitar (1, 3–7, 9, 10), Backing Vocals (3, 5, 7, 10), Organ (2, 9), Acoustic Guitar (8), Bass (8), Bongos (1), Triangle (1)
- Blixa Bargeld – Pedal Steel Guitar (1–3, 7, 9), Guitar (4, 6, 10), Backing Vocals (5, 10), Inexplicable Guitar (5), Gated Guitar (7)
- Thomas Wydler – Drums (1, 3, 5, 6, 8, 10), Brush Snare (4, 7), Shaker (2)
- Martyn P. Casey – Bass (1–7, 9, 10)
- Jim Sclavunos – Drums (2, 4, 7, 9), Backing Vocals (7), Percussion (10), Tambourine (8)
- Warren Ellis – Violin (2–10)
- Conway Savage – Backing Vocals (3, 5, 7, 10)

Guest musicians

- Chris Bailey – chorus vocals on "Bring It On"
- Johnny Turnbull – backing vocals on "He Wants You", "Bring It On", "There Is a Town" and "She Passed by My Window"
- Norman Watt-Roy – backing vocals on "He Wants You", "Bring It On" and "There Is a Town"
- Mickey Gallagher – backing vocals on "He Wants You", "Bring It On", "There Is a Town" and "She Passed by My Window"
- Chas Jankel – backing vocals on "He Wants You", "Bring It On" and "There Is a Town"

== Charts ==
=== Weekly charts ===
| Chart (2003) | Peak position |
|---|---|
| Australian Albums (ARIA) | 8 |
| Austrian Albums (Ö3 Austria) | 6 |
| Belgian Albums (Ultratop Flanders) | 1 |
| Belgian Albums (Ultratop Wallonia) | 3 |
| Danish Albums (Hitlisten) | 1 |
| Dutch Albums (Album Top 100) | 14 |
| European Albums (Eurotipsheet) | 8 |
| Finnish Albums (Suomen virallinen lista) | 4 |
| French Albums (SNEP) | 26 |
| German Albums (Offizielle Top 100) | 11 |
| Irish Albums (IFPI) | 8 |
| Italian Albums (FIMI) | 8 |
| Norwegian Albums (VG-lista) | 2 |
| Scottish Albums (Official Charts) | 13 |
| Swedish Albums (Sverigetopplistan) | 7 |
| Swiss Albums (Schweizer Hitparade) | 11 |
| UK Albums (Official Charts) | 20 |
| US Billboard 200 | 182 |

== Sales ==
Sales for Nocturama
| Region | Sales |
|---|---|
| France | 20,000 |
| Germany | 55,000 |
| Italy | 20,000 |
| Europe | 200,000 |
