= Nick Cave and the Bad Seeds =

Australian post punk/alternative rock band

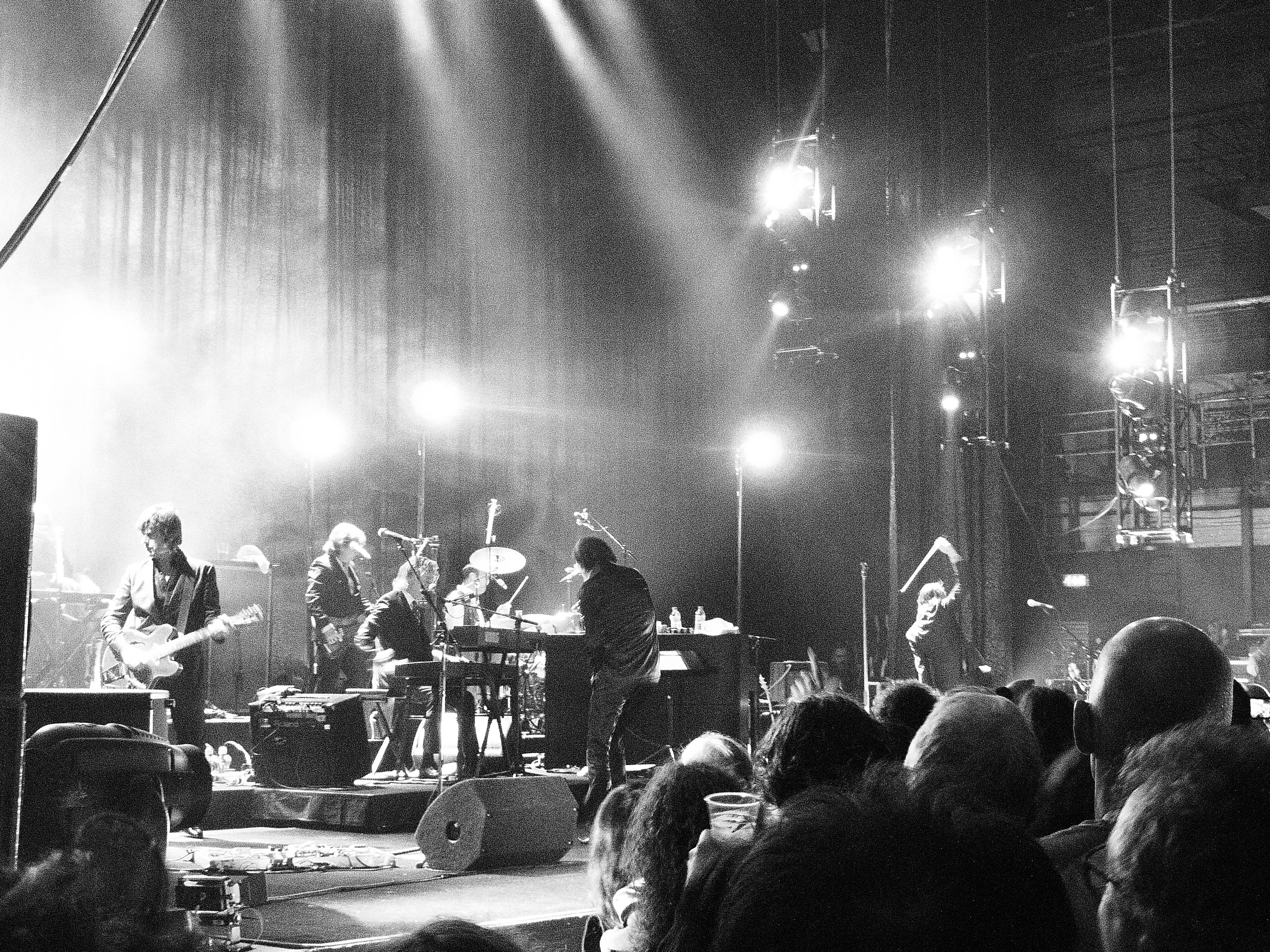
- The Bad Seeds live in London, 2013

Background information
- Origin: Melbourne, Victoria, Australia
- Genres: Alternative rock; gothic rock; experimental rock; art rock; post-punk
- Works: Discography
- Years active: 1983–present
- Labels: Bad Seed Ltd. via Kobalt Label Services; Mute; Anti-
- Spinoffs: Grinderman
- Spinoff of: The Birthday Party
- Members: Nick Cave; Thomas Wydler; Martyn P. Casey; Jim Sclavunos; Warren Ellis; George Vjestica
- Past members: Mick Harvey; Barry Adamson; Blixa Bargeld; Hugo Race; Anita Lane; Kid Congo Powers; Conway Savage; Roland Wolf; James Johnston; Ed Kuepper
- Website: nickcaveandthebadseeds.com

Nick Cave and the Bad Seeds are an Australian rock band formed in Melbourne in 1983 by lead vocalist Nick Cave, multi-instrumentalist Mick Harvey and German guitarist-vocalist Blixa Bargeld. The band has featured international personnel throughout its career and presently consists of Cave, violinist and multi-instrumentalist Warren Ellis, bassist Martyn P. Casey (all from Australia), guitarist George Vjestica (United Kingdom), touring keyboardist/percussionist Larry Mullins, also known as Toby Dammit (United States), and drummers Thomas Wydler (Switzerland) and Jim Sclavunos (United States). Described as "one of the most original and celebrated bands of the post-punk and alternative rock eras in the '80s and onward", they have released eighteen studio albums and completed numerous international tours.

The band was founded following the demise of Cave and Harvey's former group the Birthday Party, the members of which met at a boarding school in Melbourne. Throughout the 1980s, beginning with their debut studio album From Her to Eternity (1984), the band drew largely on post-punk, blues and gothic rock, and formed an evolving, multinational lineup, bringing in musicians such as Blixa Bargeld, Barry Adamson and Kid Congo Powers. The band later softened their sound and incorporated other influences on studio albums such as The Good Son (1990) and The Boatman's Call (1997). Following Harvey's departure in 2009, the band broadened their sound further to include electronic and ambient styles, which feature prominently on the trilogy of studio albums Push the Sky Away (2013), Skeleton Tree (2016) and Ghosteen (2019). Wild God is their most recent, released in 2024.

== History ==
=== Formation and early releases (1983–1985) ===
The project that later evolved into Nick Cave and the Bad Seeds began following the demise of the Birthday Party in August 1983. Both Cave and Harvey were members of the Birthday Party, along with guitarist Rowland S. Howard and bassist Tracy Pew. During the recording sessions of the Birthday Party's scheduled EPs Mutiny/The Bad Seed, internal disputes developed in the band. The difference in Cave and Howard's approach to songwriting was a major factor, as Cave explained in an interview with On The Street: "the main reason why The Birthday Party broke up was that the sort of songs that I was writing and the sort of songs that Rowland was writing were just totally at odds with each other." Following the departure of Harvey, they officially disbanded. Cave also said that "it probably would have gone on longer, but Mick has the ability to judge things much more clearly than the rest of us."

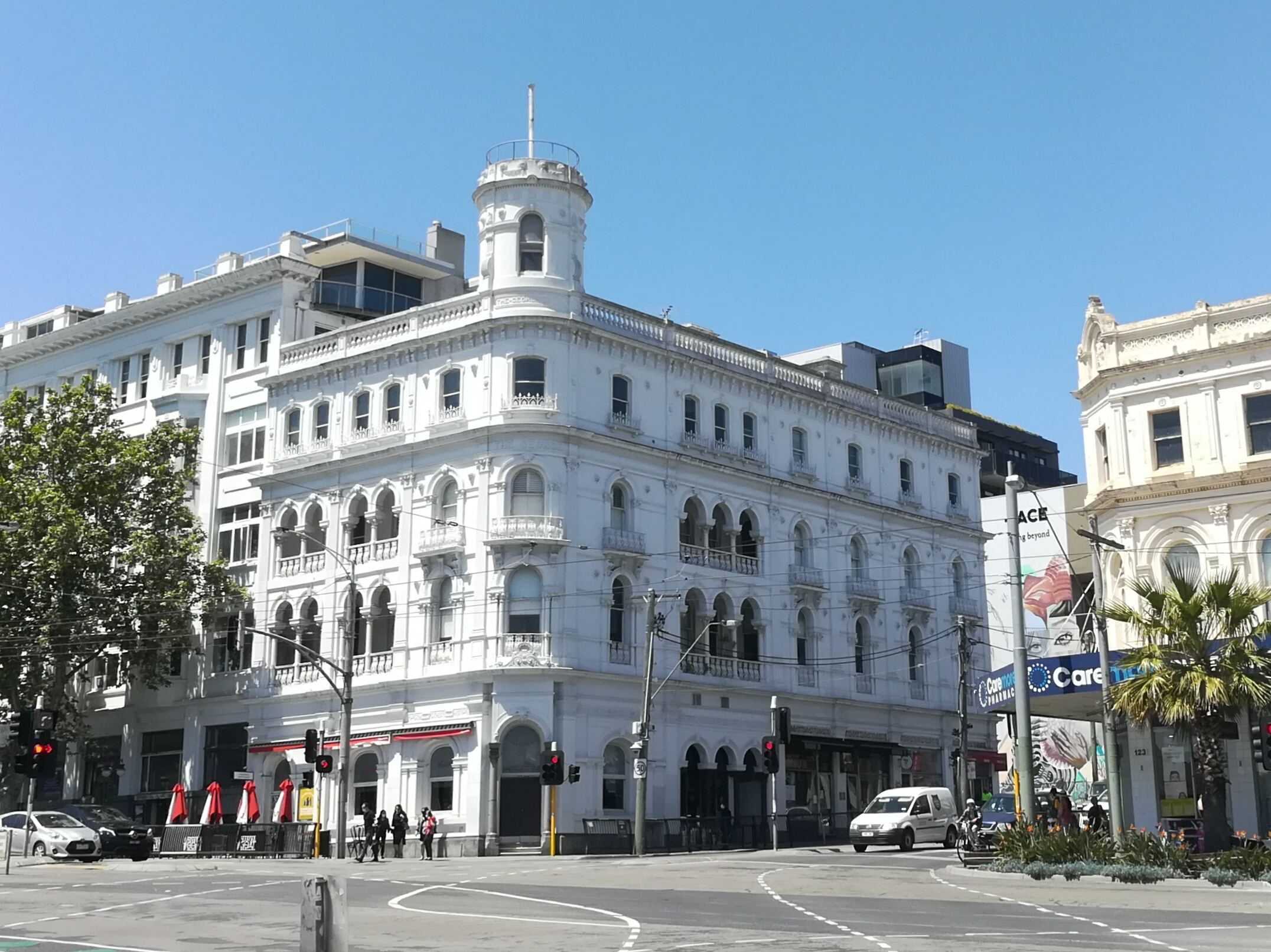
Melbourne's Crystal Ballroom, where the original incarnation of the Bad Seeds first performed, New Year's Eve 1983

An embryonic version of what became Nick Cave and the Bad Seeds was formed in the Birthday Party's then-home of London in September 1983, with Cave, Harvey (acting primarily as drummer), Einstürzende Neubauten frontman Blixa Bargeld, Magazine bassist Barry Adamson, and JG Thirlwell, known for his solo project Foetus. The band was initially formed as a backing band for Cave's intended solo project Man or Myth?, which had been approved by the record label Mute Records. During September and October 1983, they recorded material with producer Flood, although the sessions were cut short due to Cave's touring with the Immaculate Consumptive, another project formed with Thirlwell, Lydia Lunch and Marc Almond. In December 1983 Cave returned to Melbourne, Australia, where he formed a temporary line-up of his backing band, due to Bargeld's absence, that included Pew and guitarist Hugo Race. The band performed their first live show at the Crystal Ballroom in St Kilda on 31 December 1983.

Following a short Australian tour, and during a period when they were without management, Cave and his band returned to London. Cave, Harvey, Bargeld, Race and Adamson formed the project's first consistent line-up, while Cave's longtime girlfriend Anita Lane was credited as a lyricist on occasional songs (e.g., the title track of 1984's From Her to Eternity). The group, which up to this time had been nameless, adopted the moniker Nick Cave and the Cavemen, which they used for the first six months of their career. However, they were later renamed Nick Cave and the Bad Seeds in May 1984, in reference to the final Birthday Party EP The Bad Seed. They began recording sessions for their debut album in March 1984 at London's Trident Studios and these sessions, together with the abandoned Man or Myth? sessions from September–October 1983 that were recorded at The Garden studios, formed the album From Her to Eternity, released on Mute Records in 1984. Thirlwell left during the recording sessions for Eternity, citing creative disagreements and desires to work on his own solo material. Race, and touring guitarist Edward Clayton-Jones, left to form the Wreckery in Melbourne.

=== Move to Germany and stylistic evolution (1985–1989) ===
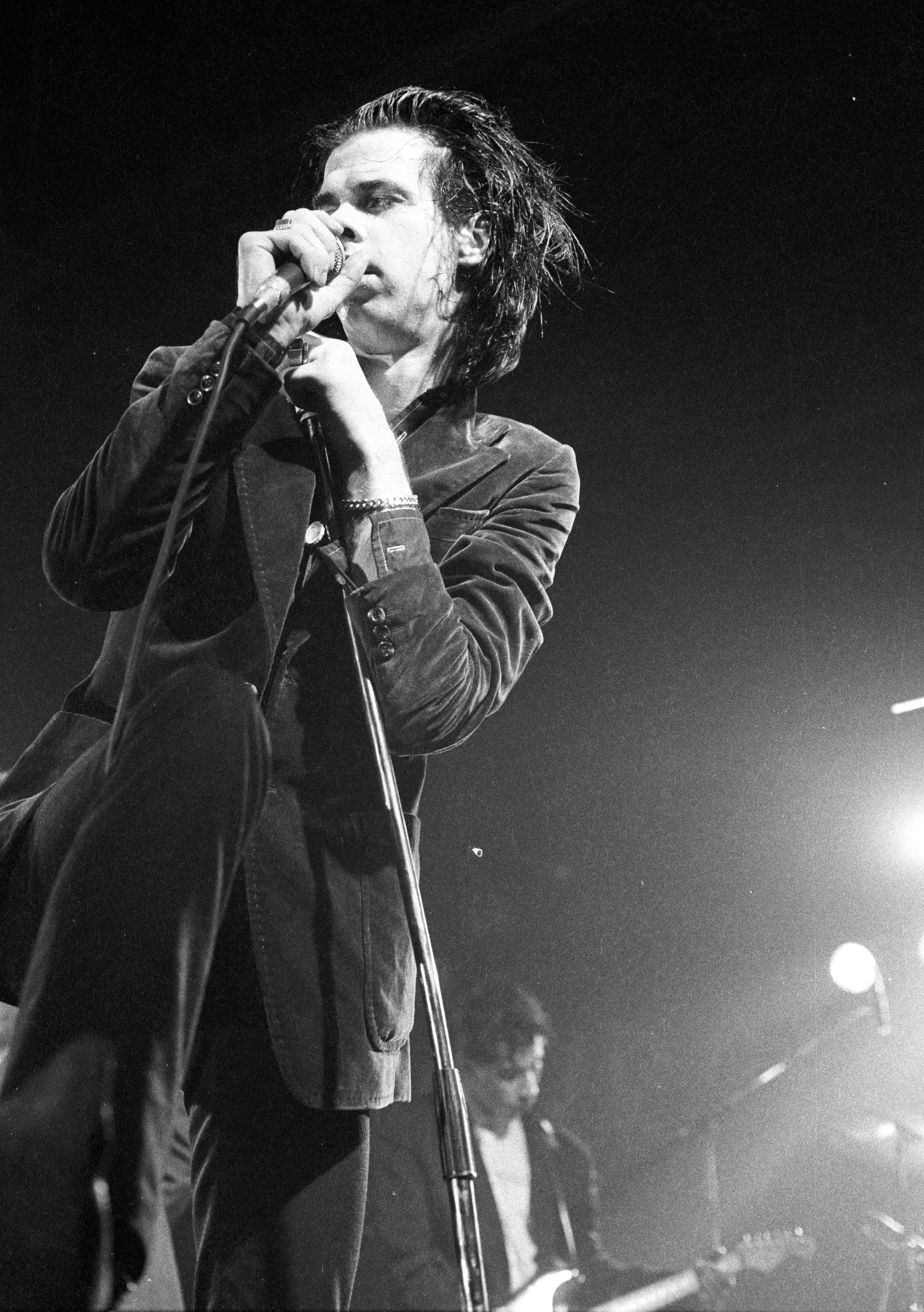
Cave and guitarist Kid Congo Powers during the band's 1986 tour.

After the departure of Race and Lane, the remaining members moved to West Berlin, Germany in 1985 and released a second album The Firstborn Is Dead. The album was heavily influenced by the gothic Americana of the American South and blues music, exemplified in songs such as "Tupelo" and "Blind Lemon Jefferson", which reference the birth of Elvis Presley and Blind Lemon Jefferson respectively. Released the following year, the album Kicking Against the Pricks explored such influences with renditions of material by Johnny Cash, John Lee Hooker and Lead Belly. The 1986 album also marked the arrival of Swiss drummer Thomas Wydler, a member of Die Haut, and featured guest appearances from Race, Pew, and Birthday Party guitarist Howard, who had briefly toured with the Bad Seeds as a substitute member in 1985. Pew's death from an epileptic seizure also occurred in 1986.

The band garnered an increased following due to a second 1986 album release, Your Funeral, My Trial, which coincided with Adamson's departure. Due to Adamson's departure and an injury which made Wydler unable to play the drums, Harvey recorded the bulk of the album's instrumentation with the only other member who contributed instruments on every track being Bargeld. Tender Prey, the dark, brooding 1988 follow-up, saw the arrival of American guitarist and The Gun Club stalwart Kid Congo Powers—Harvey made the transition to bass—and short-tenured German keyboardist Roland Wolf. The single "The Mercy Seat" chronicled an unrepentant prisoner on death row and further increased the group's critical acclaim and commercial attention. The track was later covered by Johnny Cash on his 2000 album American III: Solitary Man. Despite the increasing level of success, the drug-related issues of band members became problematic. The documentary film The Road to God Knows Where, directed by Uli M Schueppel, depicts a five-week period of the United States leg of their 1989 tour.

Cave and his bandmates also pursued other creative ambitions around this time. In 1987, the Bad Seeds appeared in the Wim Wenders film Wings of Desire, and Cave was featured in the 1988 film Ghosts... of the Civil Dead, which he and Race co-wrote. Cave's first novel And the Ass Saw the Angel was published in 1989.

=== Growing success (1989–1997) ===
After a period of time in New York City, Cave relocated to São Paulo, Brazil, shortly after the final tour for Tender Prey and, after successfully finishing drug rehabilitation, began experimenting with piano-driven ballads. The result of this post-rehabilitation period was 1990's The Good Son. Featuring a sorrowful and longing tone, the album was well-received both critically and commercially, and yielded the singles "The Weeping Song" (featuring vocals from Bargeld) and "The Ship Song".

Two established Australian musicians, Martyn P. Casey of the Triffids and solo artist and keyboardist Conway Savage, replaced the departing Powers and Wolf. The addition of Casey on bass allowed Harvey to return to guitar. Their next record, 1992's Henry's Dream, marked a change towards a harder rock sound. Producer David Briggs, known for his work with Neil Young, was enlisted for the recording process. The tour for the album is documented on 1993's live album Live Seeds and showcases the new group's aggressive sound.

Cave discussing touring, what music means to him, and tensions in the band, 1993

In mid-1993, the group returned once more to London and recorded Let Love In, the follow-up album. Let Love In expanded upon the fuller ensemble sound that was established in Henry's Dream and featured contributions from Howard, Ellis, Tex Perkins (Beasts of Bourbon) and David McComb (The Triffids). Several popular songs, such as "Red Right Hand" (which featured in the Scream film series and was used as the theme song for Peaky Blinders) and "Loverman" (later covered by Metallica), were drawn from the album. During the promotional tour for the album, American percussionist and drummer Jim Sclavunos joined the group.

In 1996 the band released Murder Ballads, their best-selling album to date. Centered on the subject of murder, the album includes a cover of the folk song "Henry Lee"—a duet with British rock singer PJ Harvey, with whom Cave had a brief relationship— and "Where the Wild Roses Grow", a duet with Australian pop idol Kylie Minogue. The Minogue collaboration was a mainstream hit in the UK and Australia, and won three Australian Recording Industry Association (ARIA) Awards, including Song of the Year. It was at this time that Ellis of the Dirty Three began regularly working with the band and eventually became Cave's primary collaborator.

The sound of The Boatman's Call, released in 1997, was a radical departure from the archetypal and violent narratives of the band's past, featuring songs about relationships, loss, and longing, often with sparse arrangements. Cave revealed his mindset during the creation of the album in a 2008 interview: "When I was making half that record I was furious because certain things had happened in my love life that seriously pissed me off. And some of those songs came straight out of that. I don't regret making it ... the songs are of a moment when you felt a certain way. When ... you just think, 'Fuck – please!'" The album's corresponding tour was later documented on the 2008 live album Live at the Royal Albert Hall. After the release of the album, Cave embarked on a brief hiatus, during which time he remarried.

=== Further musical refinement; Bargeld's departure (1997–2005) ===
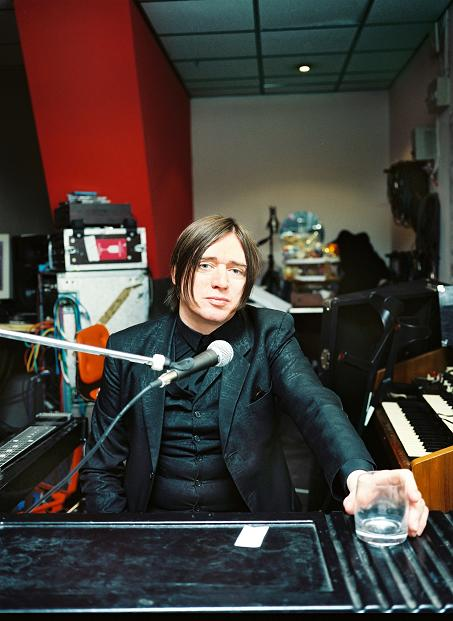
Founding guitarist Blixa Bargeld left the band in 2003

Following Cave's hiatus the band oversaw the release of Original Seeds, a compilation of material from other artists that influenced the group, as well as their own "best of" album The Best of Nick Cave and The Bad Seeds. In 1999 and 2000, the band reconvened to record two improvisations on Anita Lane's Sex O'Clock. The proper follow-up to The Boatman's Call was 2001's No More Shall We Part. The record featured guest appearances by Kate & Anna McGarrigle and was generally well received in reviews: one critic hailed the album as an "entire album of deeply tragic and beautiful love songs without irony, sarcasm, or violent resolution", while also stating that the work is at risk of devolving "into schmaltz".

The band then released Nocturama in 2003. The album marked a return to band-oriented and collaborative arrangements, as previous releases involved a decreased level of input from Cave's bandmates. Nocturama garnered mixed reviews, with critic Eric Carr stating that "in truth, it may still be the group's best work since Let Love In, but it had the potential to be so much more". Shortly after the album's release, Blixa Bargeld left the band after 20 years to devote more time to Einstürzende Neubauten.

In 2004 the band released the acclaimed two-disc set Abattoir Blues / The Lyre of Orpheus, with Bargeld replaced by the English actor, guitarist and organist James Johnston, a member of Gallon Drunk and former guest member of the Bad Seeds from a Lollapalooza tour ten years prior (Johnston only played organs on the recordings, as Harvey contributed the guitar pieces). Conceived as two separate albums packaged together, the record featured a diversity of arrangement styles, including aggressive rock and choir-driven ballads. In 2005 the band released B-Sides & Rarities, a three-volume, 56-song collection of B-sides, rarities and compilation tracks that was released on Mute Records in Europe, the US and the UK. The Abattoir Blues Tour, a two-CD, two-DVD box set with performances from the album's promotional tour, was then released in 2007 in Europe and the US. The tour included guest backing vocalists Ase Bergstrom, Geo Onaymake, Eleanor Palmer and Wendi Rose.

Also in 2005, Cave completed work on his script for The Proposition, set in 19th-century Australia directed by John Hillcoat. Cave and Ellis collaborated on the film's score, a partnership that later also scored the films The Assassination of Jesse James by the Coward Robert Ford (2007) and The Road (2009).

=== Grinderman; Harvey's departure (2006–2012) ===
After operating for several years as a touring backing band for Cave's solo work, Bad Seeds members Ellis, Sclavunos and Casey formed a new side-project Grinderman with Cave in 2006. The band, featuring Cave playing guitar for the first time, played garage rock-influenced music that still retained much of The Bad Seeds' aura and released a self-titled debut album in 2007. In October 2007 Cave was inducted into the ARIA Hall of Fame and, in his acceptance speech, also inducted the members of The Bad Seeds and The Birthday Party, after explaining, "I cannot really accept this until we get a few things straight. What I can't figure out is why I am up here and The Bad Seeds aren't?"

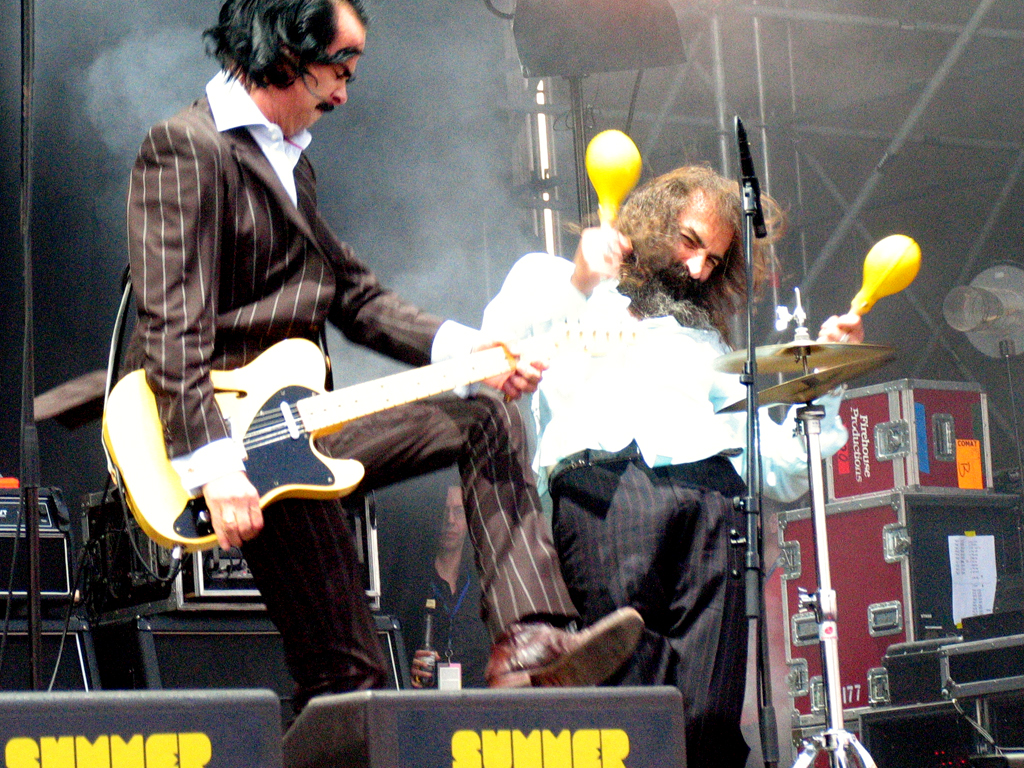
Grinderman marked a return to a raw sound, as well as Cave's debut on guitar.

Nick Cave and the Bad Seeds released their 14th studio album Dig, Lazarus, Dig!!! in 2008 and received a high level of critical acclaim. Inspired by the biblical story of Lazarus of Bethany, the album continued the punk and garage rock-inspired arrangements that were explored on the debut Grinderman album, resulting in what NME termed a "gothic psycho-sexual apocalypse". The group then embarked on a North American and European tour in support of the album, with a seven-piece lineup that did not include Johnston, who had left the group after the album's completion.

The band talking to the crowd at a 2009 show

Cave and the band curated Australia's first edition of the All Tomorrow's Parties music festival that was held in various Australian locations during January 2009. On 22 January, after the festival's completion, Harvey announced his departure from the band after 25 years, citing "a variety of personal and professional reasons". Harvey concluded his public statement by stating, "I shall continue working on the Bad Seeds back catalogue re-issues project over the coming year and look forward to the new opportunities I shall be able to accommodate as a result of my changed circumstances." Harvey's departure was the end of a 36-year-long musical collaboration between Cave and Harvey, and Cave was left as the group's only original member. The band enlisted guitarist Ed Kuepper, formerly of the Australian bands the Saints and the Laughing Clowns, as a touring member to complete the 2009 summer festival dates that were scheduled. Also in 2009, Cave published his second novel The Death of Bunny Munro, and Mute Records commenced work on a series of remastered versions of the Bad Seeds' back catalogue (some of the remastered albums included documentary footage from Iain Forsyth and Jane Pollard).

Following this string of activity, the Bad Seeds became dormant while Grinderman reactivated and released Grinderman 2 in 2010. The group also attracted further attention when their song "Up Jumped the Devil" featured in the 2010 action-adventure game Alan Wake, followed later in the year by "O Children" appearing in the film Harry Potter and the Deathly Hallows – Part 1. In December 2011, Grinderman disbanded immediately following an Australian tour. Their final performance was at the Meredith Music Festival in rural Victoria.

=== Push the Sky Away, Skeleton Tree and Ghosteen (2013–2023) ===
Nick Cave and the Bad Seeds' 15th studio album Push the Sky Away was released in mid-February 2013. During the album's recording, former member Barry Adamson rejoined the band as a bassist, then assumed a multi-instrumentalist (percussion, keyboards, vocals) role on subsequent tours. Kuepper briefly returned as the band's touring guitarist, but was replaced by George Vjestica for the European leg of the tour; Vjestica's 12-string guitar-playing was featured on several Push the Sky Away tracks.

During the Nick Cave and the Bad Seeds summer US tour in 2013, a smaller incarnation of the band recorded Live from KCRW (Cave, Ellis, Casey, Sclavunos and Adamson). In 2014 Nick Cave and The Bad Seeds toured North America with Ellis, Adamson, Sclavunos, Casey plus Conway Savage and George Vjestica. Cave embarked on solo tours in Australia and New Zealand in late 2014 and Europe in 2015 with Adamson on keyboards and percussion, joined by the rhythm section of Wydler and Casey, and with Ellis as the featured multi-instrumentalist. In May 2015, Larry Mullins replaced Adamson as a guest touring member; Adamson has not returned since, and Mullins did not participate in sessions for the subsequent Nick Cave and the Bad Seeds album.

On 2 June 2016, the official Nick Cave website announced a documentary film titled One More Time with Feeling (directed by Andrew Dominik) which was screened on 8 September 2016. It accompanies the band's acclaimed 16th album titled Skeleton Tree (released 9 September 2016). In 2017, Cave begun writing songs for the next Bad Seeds record, which is set to complete a musical trilogy the band began with Push the Sky Away. Ellis and Cave played two orchestral shows at Hamer Hall in Melbourne, Australia on 9 and 10 August, featuring a selection of their various film scores.

On 23 September 2019, Cave formally announced the album Ghosteen, to be released at the beginning of October 2019. It premiered on Nick Cave and the Bad Seeds' YouTube channel on 3 October.

On 22 October 2021, the band released B-Sides & Rarities Part II; the sequel to their 2005 compilation B-Sides & Rarities. In June 2022, the band embarked upon their first tour since the onset of COVID-19, with their 2020 Ghosteen tour having previously been cancelled due to the pandemic. For the tour, the band were joined by four additional members – keyboardist Carly Paradis and backing vocalists Janet Ramus, T Jae Cole, and Subrina McCalla – alongside returning touring keyboardist Larry Mullins, now acting as touring drummer.

=== Wild God (2024–present) ===
Nick Cave and the Bad Seeds 18th studio album Wild God was announced on 6 March 2024 and the title track was released as a single on the same day. A second single "Frogs" followed on 31 May and a third, "Long Dark Night", on 23 July. The album was released on 30 August.

== Members ==
Current members

- Nick Cave – lead vocals, piano, organ, keyboards, harmonica, percussion, electric guitar (1983–present)
- Thomas Wydler – drums, percussion, backing vocals (1985–present: touring hiatuses 2013–2015 and 2022–present)
- Martyn P. Casey – bass guitar, backing vocals (1990–present: touring hiatus 2024–present)
- Jim Sclavunos – percussion, drums, xylophone, keyboards, backing vocals (1994–present)
- Warren Ellis – violin, viola, tenor guitar, synthesizers, mandolin, bouzouki, lute, electric mandolin, flute, programming, loops, piano, percussion, backing vocals (1994–present)
- George Vjestica – acoustic and electric guitars, piano, backing vocals (2013–present)

Current touring musicians

- Larry Mullins – drums, percussion, keyboards, vibraphone, piano, organ, backing vocals (2015–present)
- Colin Greenwood – bass guitar (2024–present)
- Carly Paradis – keyboards (2022–present)
- Janet Ramus – backing vocals (2022–present)
- T Jae Cole – backing vocals (2022–present)
- Miça Townsend – backing vocals (2024–present)
- Wendi Rose – backing vocals (2024–present)

== Discography ==
Studio albums

- From Her to Eternity (1984)
- The Firstborn Is Dead (1985)
- Kicking Against the Pricks (1986)
- Your Funeral... My Trial (1986)
- Tender Prey (1988)
- The Good Son (1990)
- Henry's Dream (1992)
- Let Love In (1994)
- Murder Ballads (1996)
- The Boatman's Call (1997)
- No More Shall We Part (2001)
- Nocturama (2003)
- Abattoir Blues / The Lyre of Orpheus (2004)
- Dig, Lazarus, Dig!!! (2008)
- Push the Sky Away (2013)
- Skeleton Tree (2016)
- Ghosteen (2019)
- Wild God (2024)

== Awards ==
=== APRA Music Awards ===
The APRA Awards are presented annually from 1982 by the Australasian Performing Right Association (APRA), "honouring composers and songwriters". They commenced in 1982.

| Year | Nominee / work | Award | Result | Ref. |
|---|---|---|---|---|
| 1994 | "Do You Love Me?" | Song of the Year | Nominated | |
| 1996 | Nick Cave | Songwriter of the Year | Won | |
| 1996 | "Where the Wild Roses Grow" | Most Performed Australian Work | Nominated | |
| 1996 | "Where the Wild Roses Grow" | Song of the Year | Nominated | |
| 1998 | "Into My Arms" | Song of the Year | Nominated | |
| 2021 | "Ghosteen" (Nick Cave & Warren Ellis) | Song of the Year | Shortlisted | |
| 2025 | "Wild God" (Nick Cave & Warren Ellis) | Song of the Year | Shortlisted | |

=== ARIA Music Awards ===
The ARIA Music Awards is an annual awards ceremony that recognises excellence, innovation, and achievement across all genres of Australian music. They commenced in 1987.

| Year | Nominee / work | Award | Result | Ref. |
|---|---|---|---|---|
| 1995 | Let Love In | Best Group | Nominated | |
| 1995 | "Do You Love Me?" | Single of the Year | Nominated | |
| 1996 | Murder Ballads | Album of the Year | Nominated | |
| 1996 | Murder Ballads | Best Alternative Release | Nominated | |
| 1996 | "Where the Wild Roses Grow" (with Kylie Minogue) | Song of the Year | Won | |
| 1996 | "Where the Wild Roses Grow" (with Kylie Minogue) | Single of the Year | Won | |
| 1996 | "Where the Wild Roses Grow" (with Kylie Minogue) | Best Pop Release | Won | |
| 1997 | The Boatman's Call | Album of the Year | Nominated | |
| 1997 | The Boatman's Call | Best Alternative Release | Nominated | |
| 1997 | "Into My Arms" | Song of the Year | Nominated | |
| 1997 | "Into My Arms" | Single of the Year | Nominated | |
| 2001 | No More Shall We Part | Best Male Artist (Nick Cave) | Won | |
| 2003 | Nocturama | Best Male Artist (Nick Cave) | Nominated | |
| 2003 | Nocturama | Best Rock Album | Nominated | |
| 2007 | Cave (honorary inductees Harvey, Ellis, Savage, Casey) | ARIA Hall of Fame | inducted | |
| 2008 | Dig, Lazarus, Dig!!! | Album of the Year | Nominated | |
| 2008 | Dig, Lazarus, Dig!!! | Best Male Artist (Cave) | Won | |
| 2008 | Dig, Lazarus, Dig!!! | Best Rock Album | Nominated | |
| 2013 | Push The Sky Away | Album of the Year | Nominated | |
| 2013 | Push The Sky Away | Best Group | Nominated | |
| 2013 | Push The Sky Away | Best Independent Release | Won | |
| 2013 | Push The Sky Away | Best Adult Contemporary Album | Won | |
| 2013 | "Jubilee Street" (directed by John Hillcoat) | Best Video | Nominated | |
| 2013 | Nick Cave and the Bad Seeds | Best Australian Live Act | Nominated | |
| 2014 | Live from KCRW | Best Adult Contemporary Album | Nominated | |
| 2015 | Nick Cave and the Bad Seeds | Best Australian Live Act | Nominated | |
| 2017 | Skeleton Tree | Best Group | Nominated | |
| 2017 | Skeleton Tree | Best Adult Contemporary Album | Nominated | |
| 2017 | Nick Cave and the Bad Seeds | Best Australian Live Act | Nominated | |
| 2020 | Ghosteen | Best Independent Release | Nominated | |
| 2020 | Ghosteen | Best Adult Contemporary Album | Nominated | |

=== Australian Music Prize ===
The Australian Music Prize (the AMP) is an annual award of $30,000 given to an Australian band or solo artist in recognition of the merit of an album released during the year of award. The commenced in 2005.

| Year | Nominee / work | Award | Result | Ref. |
|---|---|---|---|---|
| 2019 | Ghosteen | Australian Music Prize | Nominated | |
| 2024 | Wild God | Australian Music Prize | Nominated | |

=== Australian Independent Music Award ===
| Year | Nominee / work | Award | Result |
|---|---|---|---|
| 2013 | Push the Sky Away | Independent Album of the Year | Nominated |
| 2020 | Ghosteen | Best Independent Rock Album or EP | Nominated |

=== EG Awards / Music Victoria Awards ===
The EG Awards (known as Music Victoria Awards since 2013) are an annual awards night celebrating Victorian music. They commenced in 2006.

| Year | Nominee / work | Award | Result |
|---|---|---|---|
| 2008 | Dig, Lazarus, Dig!!! | Best Album | Won |
| 2008 | Nick Cave and the Bad Seeds | Best Band | Won |

=== NME Awards ===
| Year | Nominee / work | Award | Result |
|---|---|---|---|
| 2013 | Themselves | Best International Band | Nominated |

=== Q Awards ===
| Year | Nominee / work | Award | Result |
|---|---|---|---|
| 1999 | Themselves | Best Live Act | Nominated |
| 2008 | Themselves | Best Live Act | Nominated |
| 2008 | Dig, Lazarus, Dig | Best Album | Nominated |

=== Rolling Stone Australia Awards ===
The Rolling Stone Australia Awards are awarded annually in January or February by the Australian edition of Rolling Stone magazine for outstanding contributions to popular culture in the previous year.

| Year | Nominee / work | Award | Result | Ref. |
|---|---|---|---|---|
| 2025 | Wild God | Best LP/EP | Shortlisted | |
| 2025 | Nick Cave and Bad Seeds | Rolling Stone Global Award | Shortlisted | |

=== World Music Awards ===
| Year | Nominee / work | Award | Result |
|---|---|---|---|
| 2014 | Themselves | World's Best Group | Nominated |
| 2014 | Themselves | World's Best Live Act | Nominated |
| 2014 | Push the Sky Away | World's Best Album | Nominated |

- 2001 Australasian Performing Right Association (APRA) 75th Anniversary: "The Ship Song" voted in the APRA Top 30 Australian songs
- 2004 MOJO Awards: Best Album of 2004 (Abattoir Blues / The Lyre of Orpheus)
- 2008 MOJO Awards: Best Album of 2008 (Dig, Lazarus, Dig!!!)
- 2014 The Ivor Novello Awards: Best Album award for song writing for Push the Sky Away
- 2017 Grammy Awards: Best Music Film for One More Time with Feeling
