= The Firstborn Is Dead =

Studio album by Nick Cave and the Bad Seeds
- Released: 3 June 1985
- Recorded: November–December 1984
- Studio: Hansa Tonstudio (West Berlin)
- Genres: Blues; country blues
- Length: 40:37
- Label: Mute
- Producers: Nick Cave and the Bad Seeds; Flood

Nick Cave and the Bad Seeds chronology
From Her to Eternity (1984)	The Firstborn Is Dead (1985)	Kicking Against the Pricks (1986)

Singles from The Firstborn Is Dead
- 1. "Tupelo" Released: 29 July 1985

The Firstborn Is Dead is the second studio album by the Australian rock band Nick Cave and the Bad Seeds, released on 3 June 1985 by Mute Records. Produced by the band and Flood, the album saw lead vocalist Nick Cave continue his fascination with the Southern United States, featuring references to Elvis Presley and bluesmen like Blind Lemon Jefferson. The album was recorded in the Hansa Studios in West Berlin, West Germany. Cave later said of the album, "Berlin gave us the freedom and encouragement to do whatever we wanted. We'd lived in London for three years and it seemed that if you stuck your head out of the box, people were pretty quick to knock it back in. Particularly if you were Australian. When we came to Berlin it was the opposite. People saw us as some kind of force rather than a kind of whacky novelty act."

The album's name is a reference to Jesse Garon Presley, the stillborn identical twin of Elvis Presley. The cover art photography was taken by Jutta Henglein-Bildau.

The album was remastered and reissued on 27 April 2009 as a collector's edition CD/DVD set. The CD features the original 7-song vinyl LP's track listing, while "The Six Strings That Drew Blood" is featured as a bonus audio track on the accompanying DVD.

== Critical reception ==
Professional ratings
Review scores
Source	Rating
AllMusic	4/5 stars
NME	7/10
Pitchfork	7.0/10
Q	4/5 stars
Record Mirror	4/5
The Rolling Stone Album Guide	4/5 stars
Select	4/5
Sounds	4.75/5 stars
Spin Alternative Record Guide	6/10
Uncut	3/5 stars

Spin critic Andrea 'Enthal wrote that "The Firstborn Is Dead, with its blue cover and mournfully authentic blue lines of harmonica and guitar, journeys through a mythical southern reality heavy on train wrecks, suicides, prison life, and big black crows. Cave's concept of America has been peeled from the grooves of old blues and Western cowboy 78s, then lovingly woven into an epic poem where John Lee Hooker meets Elvis Presley in a stream of consciousness that floods the equally mythical valley town, Tupelo."

== Track listing ==
All lyrics are written by Nick Cave, except "Wanted Man" by Bob Dylan, Johnny Cash and Cave

Side one
No.	Title	Music	Length
1.	"Tupelo"	Barry Adamson; Mick Harvey	7:17
2.	"Say Goodbye to the Little Girl Tree"	Harvey	5:10
3.	"Train Long-Suffering"	Nick Cave	3:49
4.	"Black Crow King"	Blixa Bargeld; Cave	5:05

Side two
No.	Title	Writer(s)	Length
5.	"Knockin' On Joe"	Cave	7:39
6.	"Wanted Man"	Bob Dylan	5:29
7.	"Blind Lemon Jefferson"	Adamson, Bargeld, Harvey, Cave	6:09

=== Song details ===
- "Tupelo" is loosely based on the John Lee Hooker song "Tupelo Blues", which is about a flood in Tupelo, Mississippi (Hooker's song appears on Original Seeds). Tupelo is the birthplace of Elvis Presley. Cave's song incorporates imagery of the birth of Elvis Presley and the apocalypse at the Second Coming of Christ. However, the "Looky, Looky Yonder" motif that features in the song is derived from a song of the same name recorded by Lead Belly, usually found as part of a medley which Cave himself covered under the title "Black Betty" on his third studio album, Kicking Against the Pricks (1986).
- "Wanted Man" evolved from a song composed by Bob Dylan and Johnny Cash. Cave was granted permission to alter the lyrics. Cave's lyrics include references to his friends, such as photographer Polly Borland.
- "The Six Strings that Drew Blood" is included on the 1988 CD reissue of the album, but not on the original LP. It was the B-side of the "Tupelo" single and is a remake of a song Cave originally recorded with the Birthday Party during the Mutiny sessions in 1982.

== Singles ==
- "Tupelo" (MUTE 038) (29 July 1985)
  - "Tupelo" (single version) b/w: "The Six Strings That Drew Blood"

== Personnel ==
Nick Cave and the Bad Seeds

- Nick Cave – lead vocals; harmonica
- Blixa Bargeld – guitar; backing vocals; slide guitar; piano
- Barry Adamson – bass; backing vocals; guitar; organ; drums
- Mick Harvey – drums; backing vocals; guitar; organ; piano; bass

== Chart positions ==
Chart performance for From the Lions Mouth
Chart (1985)	Peak position
UK Albums Chart	53
UK Independent Albums Chart	2

Chart (2025)	Peak position
Croatian International Albums (HDU)	13
