= The Abattoir Blues Tour =

Live album by Nick Cave and the Bad Seeds
- Released: 29 January 2007
- Recorded: June 2003–November 2004
- Genre: Rock
- Length: 91:46
- Label: Mute

Nick Cave and the Bad Seeds chronology
B-Sides & Rarities (2005)	The Abattoir Blues Tour (2007)	Dig, Lazarus, Dig!!! (2008)

Professional ratings
Review scores
Source	Rating
AllMusic	3.5/5 stars
Clash	(average)
Pitchfork	(7.5/10)
Slant Magazine	2/5 stars
Stylus Magazine	B+

The Abattoir Blues Tour is the second live album by Nick Cave and the Bad Seeds, released on 29 January 2007. The deluxe release includes two audio CDs and two DVDs.

== Track listing ==
Disc one
No.	Title	Length
1.	"O Children"	6:59
2.	"Hiding All Away"	6:23
3.	"Breathless"	3:36
4.	"Get Ready for Love"	4:59
5.	"Red Right Hand"	5:24
6.	"The Ship Song"	4:09
7.	"The Weeping Song"	4:39
8.	"Stagger Lee"	8:44
Total length:		55:50

Disc two
No.	Title	Length
1.	"Carry Me"	4:49
2.	"Let the Bells Ring"	4:55
3.	"Easy Money"	7:08
4.	"Supernaturally"	5:13
5.	"Babe, You Turn Me On"	5:08
6.	"There She Goes, My Beautiful World"	5:29
7.	"God Is in the House"	4:46
8.	"Deanna"	3:43
9.	"Lay Me Low"	5:49
Total length:		46:56

=== DVD 1 ===
Brixton Academy, London - Thursday, 11 November 2004

1. "Hiding All Away"
2. "Messiah Ward"
3. "Easy Money"
4. "Supernaturally"
5. "The Lyre of Orpheus"
6. "Babe, You Turn Me On"
7. "Nature Boy"
8. "Get Ready for Love"
9. "Carry Me"
10. "There She Goes, My Beautiful World"
11. "God Is in the House"
12. "Red Right Hand"
13. "The Ship Song"
14. "Stagger Lee"

==== Personnel ====
- Nick Cave – vocals, piano
- Martyn P. Casey – bass
- Warren Ellis – violin, mandolin, bouzouki, flute
- Mick Harvey – guitars, bouzouki
- James Johnston - organ, guitar
- Conway Savage – piano
- Jim Sclavunos – drums and percussion
- Thomas Wydler – drums and percussion
- Geo Onaymake – vocals (Background)
- Eleanor Palmer – vocals (Background)
- Wendi Rose – vocals (Background)

=== DVD 2 ===
Hammersmith Apollo, London - Saturday, 7 June 2003

1. "Wonderful Life"
2. "Nobody's Baby Now"
3. "Bring It On"
4. "Sad Waters"
5. "Watching Alice"
6. "Christina the Astonishing"
7. "Wild World"

Bonus Materials, Promotional Videos on DVD 2

1. "Bring it On"
2. "Babe, I'm on Fire"
3. "Nature Boy"
4. "Breathless"
5. "Get Ready for Love"
6. "Abattoir Blues/The Lyre of Orpheus", a short film

==== Personnel ====
- Nick Cave – vocals, piano
- Martyn P. Casey – bass
- Warren Ellis – violin, mandolin, bouzouki, flute
- Mick Harvey – guitars, bouzouki
- James Johnston organ, guitar
- Conway Savage – piano
- Jim Sclavunos – drums and percussion
- Thomas Wydler – drums and percussion
- Chris Bailey – guest vocals on "Bring it On"
- Blixa Bargeld – features in the "Bring it On" video, "Babe, I'm On Fire" video and the "Bring It On Shoot" feature on guitar
- Geo Onaymake – vocals (Background)
- Eleanor Palmer – vocals (Background)
- Wendi Rose – vocals (Background)
