= From Her to Eternity =

Studio album by Nick Cave and the Bad Seeds
- Released: May 1984
- Recorded: September–October 1983 and March 1984
- Studios: The Garden (London); Trident (London)
- Genres: Post-punk; gothic rock; punk blues; gothic blues; post-industrial; avant-garde
- Length: 43:32
- Label: Mute
- Producers: Flood; Nick Cave and the Bad Seeds

Nick Cave and the Bad Seeds chronology
From Her to Eternity (1984)	The Firstborn Is Dead (1985)

Singles from From Her to Eternity
- 1. "In the Ghetto" Released: June 18, 1984

From Her to Eternity is the debut studio album by the Australian rock band Nick Cave and the Bad Seeds, released in May 1984 by Mute Records. Produced by Flood and the band itself, the album's title is a pun on James Jones' debut novel, From Here to Eternity (1951), and its subsequent 1953 film adaptation.

== Background and production ==
After the break-up of Nick Cave's former band the Birthday Party, Cave formed a new project with former band member Mick Harvey. Cave and Harvey were joined by a semi-fluid group of bandmates, initially including Einstürzende Neubauten member Blixa Bargeld on guitar, Hugo Race on guitar, and former Magazine member Barry Adamson on guitar, bass, and piano. After some studio work, the band's premiere public performance was held on New Year's Eve, 1983 at the Crystal Ballroom in Melbourne, under the name "Nick Cave – Man or Myth?", followed by a tour. The band then briefly called themselves "Nick Cave and the Cavemen" before adopting the "Bad Seeds" moniker, in reference to the final Birthday Party release, The Bad Seed extended play (EP).

Described as post-punk, gothic rock, punk blues, gothic blues, post-industrial and avant-garde, the majority of the album was recorded at Trident Studios in London in March 1984. "Saint Huck", "Wings off Flies" and "A Box for Black Paul" were recorded at The Garden studio (owned by John Foxx of Ultravox) between September and October 1983. JG Thirlwell, an early member of the group, co-wrote "Wings Off Flies" and made uncredited instrumental contributions to the album, but departed early in the recording sessions due to creative disagreements and to work on his own solo material. The band is also seen playing a live performance of the title track in the 1987 Wim Wenders film Wings of Desire. This version, recorded at Hansa Studio, Berlin in February 1987, is included on CD reissues of the album.

Cave later said, "Well, I guess we weren't kicking people in the teeth anymore. I mean, it just became different. I wanted it to be more lyrically orientated and getting Blixa Bargeld from Einstürzende Neubauten in the group made an incredible difference. He's a completely kind of atmospheric guitarist and incredibly economical and it gave me room to breathe."

== Critical reception ==
Professional ratings
Review scores
Source	Rating
AllMusic	4.5/5 stars
The Guardian	4/5 stars
NME	6/10
Pitchfork	7.3/10
Q	4/5 stars
The Rolling Stone Album Guide	3.5/5 stars
Select	4/5
Sounds	4/5 stars
Spin Alternative Record Guide	8/10
Uncut	4/5 stars

From Her to Eternity has been well received by critics. NME reviewer Mat Snow said it was "one of the greatest rock albums ever made. Dynamic, subtly layered, funny and plain obsessive, From Her to Eternity is the work of a visionary unfettered by worship of the romantic rock'n'roll mythology, and which thus reaches peaks hitherto unscaled."

Trouser Press wrote that while "the album relies less on shock effects than any the Birthday Party ever made, the explosive parts are that much more effective." Chris Long of BBC Music described it as "imperfect, visceral, exciting and, ultimately, classic."

In 2018, Pitchfork ranked From Her to Eternity 63rd on their list of "The 200 Best Albums of the 1980s", calling it "ghoulish to the point of ridiculousness, which is the entire point. In the Bad Seeds' visceral hyperbole is something powerful, as though we're hearing humankind's palm read by a fortune teller with a cockeyed grin and a hand snatching your wallet."

== 2009 remaster ==
The album was remastered and reissued on 27 April 2009 as a collector's edition CD/DVD set, along with the three subsequent studio albums in the Bad Seeds catalog, namely The Firstborn Is Dead (1985), Kicking Against the Pricks and Your Funeral... My Trial (both 1986). The CD features the original 7-song vinyl LP's track listing, while "In the Ghetto", "The Moon Is in the Gutter", and "From Her to Eternity" (1987 version) are featured as bonus audio tracks on the accompanying DVD, rather than being sequenced into the album as in earlier CD pressings. The DVD also includes music videos from the time and the first installment of 'Do You Love Me Like I Love You', a 14-part documentary by Iain Forsyth and Jane Pollard.

== Track listing ==
All tracks are written by Nick Cave, unless otherwise noted.

Side one
No.	Title	Lyrics	Music	Length
1.	"Avalanche"	Leonard Cohen	Cohen	5:13
2.	"Cabin Fever!"	Cave	Cave; Blixa Bargeld	6:11
3.	"Well of Misery"			5:25
4.	"From Her to Eternity"	Cave; Anita Lane	Cave; Bargeld; Hugo Race; Barry Adamson; Mick Harvey	5:33

Side two
No.	Title	Lyrics	Music	Length
5.	"Saint Huck"			7:22
6.	"Wings Off Flies"	Cave; Peter Sutcliffe	Cave; Jim Thirlwell	4:06
7.	"A Box for Black Paul"			9:42
Total length:				43:32

1988 CD release
No.	Title	Lyrics	Music	Length
1.	"Avalanche"	Cohen	Cohen	5:13
2.	"Cabin Fever!"	Cave	Cave; Bargeld	6:11
3.	"Well of Misery"			5:25
4.	"From Her to Eternity"	Cave; Lane	Cave; Bargeld; Race; Adamson; Harvey	5:33
5.	"In the Ghetto"	Mac Davis	Davis	4:06
6.	"The Moon Is in the Gutter"			2:36
7.	"Saint Huck"			7:22
8.	"Wings Off Flies"	Cave; Sutcliffe	Cave; Thirlwell	4:06
9.	"A Box for Black Paul"			9:42
10.	"From Her to Eternity" (1987)	Cave; Lane	Cave; Bargeld; Race; Adamson; Harvey	4:35
Total length:				54:49

== Personnel ==
All personnel credits adapted from From Her to Eternity's album notes, unless otherwise noted.

Nick Cave and the Bad Seeds

- Nick Cave – lead vocals; Hammond organ
- Barry Adamson – bass; backing vocals
- Blixa Bargeld – guitar; slide guitar; backing vocals
- Mick Harvey – drums; piano; guitar; vibraphone; organ; backing vocals
- Anita Lane (credited as band member, but does not perform on the album)
- Hugo Race – guitar; backing vocals
- JG Thirlwell (uncredited, instruments played unknown)

Technical personnel

- Flood – engineering
- Tim Tom – LP mastering

Design personnel

- Marina Strocchi – front cover photography
- Jessamy Calkin – back cover photography

2009 Collector's Edition Remaster personnel

- Mick Harvey – executive production; 5.1 surround sound mixing
- David Rowntree – executive production
- Rachel Willis – executive production
- Shaun Connon – executive production
- Kevin Van Bergen – master-tape transfer
- Kevin Paul – 5.1 surround sound mixing
- Simon Heyworth – remastering
- Amy Hanson – sleeve notes
- Anne Carruthers – co-ordination
- MJ Salisbury – co-ordination

== Charts ==
=== Weekly charts ===
Weekly chart performance for From Her to Eternity
Chart (1984)	Peak position
UK Albums (OCC)	40
UK Independent Albums (OCC)	1

Chart (2024–2025)	Peak position
Belgian Albums (Ultratop Flanders)	171
Croatian International Albums (HDU)	15
