= Tupelo (song) =

Single by Nick Cave and the Bad Seeds

from the album The Firstborn Is Dead
- B-side: "The Six Strings That Drew Blood"
- Released: 29 July 1985
- Recorded: December 1984
- Studio: Hansa Studios (Berlin, Germany)
- Genre: Post-punk
- Length: 5:01
- Label: Mute
- Songwriters: Barry Adamson; Nick Cave; Mick Harvey
- Producer: Flood

Nick Cave and the Bad Seeds singles chronology
"In the Ghetto" (1984)	"Tupelo" (1985)	"The Singer" (1986)

Music video
- "Tupelo" on YouTube

"Tupelo" is the second single by Australian post-punk band Nick Cave and the Bad Seeds and the only single from the band's second album The Firstborn Is Dead.

== Background and production ==
The song was written in 1984 by Cave along with Barry Adamson (who plays drums on the track) and Mick Harvey (who plays bass). Using biblical imagery, the song describes the birth of Elvis Presley during a heavy storm in Tupelo, Mississippi. The song is loosely based on the John Lee Hooker song of the same title, which also focuses on a flood in the same town. The "looky looky yonder" motif that is featured in the song is derived from a song of the same name recorded by Lead Belly, usually found as part of a medley which Cave himself covered under the title "Black Betty" on Nick Cave and the Bad Seeds' third album, Kicking Against the Pricks. "Tupelo" was released on July 1985.

== "The Six Strings That Drew Blood" ==
"Tupelo"'s B-side, "The Six Strings That Drew Blood", was recorded in March 1985 at Trident Studios in London and was a re-recording of a song Cave originally recorded with the Birthday Party during the Mutiny EP sessions in 1982. The original version of the song is included on the Birthday Party's Mutiny/The Bad Seed compilation album.

== Critical reception ==
The song was ranked number 5 among the "Tracks of the Year" for 1985 by NME. In 2020, Far Out ranked the song number six on their list of the 20 greatest Nick Cave songs, and in 2023, Mojo ranked the song number four on their list of the 30 greatest Nick Cave songs.

== Track listing ==
All songs written by Nick Cave, except where noted

- Standard 7" vinyl
1. "Tupelo" (Barry Adamson, Cave, Mick Harvey) – 5:01
2. "The Six Strings That Drew Blood" – 4:50
- Standard 12" vinyl
1. "Tupelo" – 5:01
2. "In the Ghetto" (Mac Davis) – 4:08
3. "The Moon Is in the Gutter" – 2:38
4. "The Six Strings That Drew Blood" – 4:50

== Cover versions ==
- SikTh covered the song on their album The Trees Are Dead & Dried Out Wait for Something Wild.

== Charts ==
Chart (1985)	Peak position
UK Indie Chart	1

== See also ==
- Nick Cave and the Bad Seeds discography
