= Nick Cave and the Bad Seeds discography =

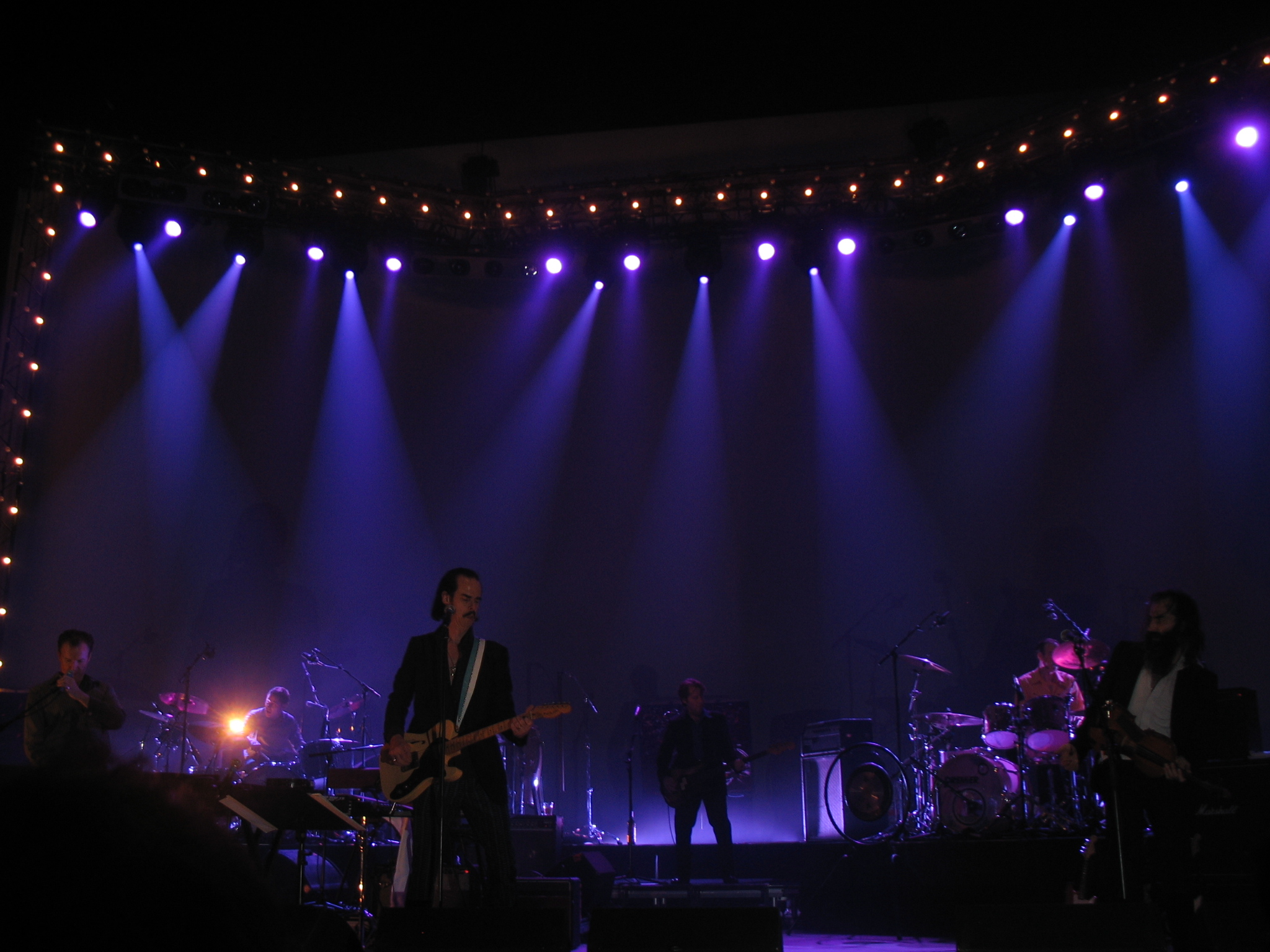
- Nick Cave and the Bad Seeds in 2008.
- Studio albums: 18
- Extended plays: 3
- Live albums: 5
- Compilation albums: 4
- Singles: 38
- Video albums: 5
- Music videos: 38

The discography of Nick Cave and the Bad Seeds, a rock band with multi-national personnel, consists of 18 studio albums, 12 of which have reached the UK top 40, the last four going Top 5; five live albums; four compilation albums; 36 singles, 16 of which reached the UK Indie Top 10; five video albums and 38 music videos.

== Albums ==
=== Studio albums ===
Title	Album details	Peak chart positions										Sales	Certifications
Title	Album details	AUS	AUT	FIN	GER	NL	NOR	NZ	SWE	UK	US	Sales	Certifications
From Her to Eternity	Released: May 1984; Label: Mute; Formats: CD, LP, MC	—	—	—	—	—	—	—	—	40	—		
The Firstborn Is Dead	Released: 3 June 1985; Label: Mute; Formats: CD, LP, MC	—	—	—	—	—	—	—	—	53	—		
Kicking Against the Pricks	Released: 18 August 1986; Label: Mute; Formats: CD, LP, MC	—	—	—	—	48	—	—	49	89	—		
Your Funeral... My Trial	Released: 3 November 1986; Label: Mute; Formats: CD, 2x12", MC	98	—	—	—	—	—	—	—	—	—		
Tender Prey	Released: 19 September 1988; Label: Mute; Formats: CD, LP, MC	109	—	27	—	—	—	—	—	67	—	US: 40,000	
The Good Son	Released: 17 April 1990; Label: Mute; Formats: CD, LP, MC	93	—	39	—	44	19	—	38	47	—	US: 30,000	
Henry's Dream	Released: 27 April 1992; Label: Mute; Formats: CD, LP, MC	41	40	38	59	70	—	47	49	29	—	US: 45,000	
Let Love In	Released: 18 April 1994; Label: Mute; Formats: CD, LP, MC	8	14	21	34	57	18	35	10	12	—	US: 80,000	ARIA: Gold; BPI: Silver
Murder Ballads	Released: 5 February 1996; Label: Mute; Formats: CD, LP, MC, MD	3	1	7	5	18	1	12	1	8	—	US: 111,000	BPI: Gold
The Boatman's Call	Released: 3 March 1997; Label: Mute; Formats: CD, LP, MC	5	18	17	19	58	2	4	3	22	155		BPI: Gold; IFPI DEN: Platinum
No More Shall We Part	Released: 2 April 2001; Label: Mute; Formats: CD, 2xLP, MC, MD	4	4	10	8	23	1	21	8	15	180		BPI: Silver; IFPI NOR: Gold
Nocturama	Released: 3 February 2003; Label: Mute; Formats: CD, LP, MC	8	6	4	11	14	2	—	7	20	182		
Abattoir Blues / The Lyre of Orpheus	Released: 20 September 2004; Label: Mute; Formats: 2xCD, 2xLP	5	2	6	7	7	1	11	3	11	126		ARIA: Gold; BPI: Gold
Dig, Lazarus, Dig!!!	Released: 3 March 2008; Label: Mute; Formats: CD, LP	2	3	9	6	10	2	5	3	4	64		ARIA: Gold; BPI: Gold; IRMA: Gold
Push the Sky Away	Released: 18 February 2013; Label: Bad Seed Ltd; Formats: CD, LP, digital download	1	1	5	2	1	2	1	3	3	29	UK: 98,627; US: 57,000	ARIA: Gold; BPI: Gold; IFPI DEN: Gold
Skeleton Tree	Released: 9 September 2016; Label: Bad Seed Ltd; Formats: CD, LP, digital download	1	2	1	3	2	1	1	2	2	27	UK: 81,433; US: 15,000	ARIA: Gold; BEA: Platinum; BPI: Silver
Ghosteen	Released: 4 October 2019; Label: Ghosteen Ltd; Formats: 2xCD, 2xLP, digital download	2	3	7	6	4	16	11	7	4	108		BEA: Gold; BPI: Silver
Wild God	Released: 30 August 2024; Label: Play It Again Sam; Formats: CD, LP, digital download	2	2	5	2	1	5	4	7	5	66	US: 13,000	
"—" denotes releases that did not chart or were not released in that territory.

=== Live albums ===
Title	Album details	Peak chart positions						
Title	Album details	AUS	AUT	GER	NL	POR	UK	UK Indie
Live Seeds	Released: 6 September 1993; Label: Mute; Formats: CD, 2xLP	47	—	—	88	14	67	8
The Abattoir Blues Tour	Released: 29 January 2007; Label: Mute; Formats: 2xCD	—	—	—	—	—	—	—
Live at the Royal Albert Hall	Released: 24 November 2008; Label: Mute; Formats: CD	—	—	—	—	—	—	—
Live from KCRW	Released: 29 November 2013; Label: Bad Seed Ltd; Formats: CD, 2xLP, digital download	—	24	51	46	—	81	5
Live God	Released: 5 December 2025; Labels: Bad Seed Ltd, PIAS; Formats: 2xCD, 2xLP, digital download	22	9	14	22	87	33	2
"—" denotes releases that did not chart or were not released in that territory.

=== Compilation albums ===
Title	Album details	Peak chart positions										Certifications
Title	Album details	AUS	AUT	FIN	GER	NL	NOR	NZ	SWE	UK	UK Indie	Certifications
The Best of Nick Cave and the Bad Seeds	Released: 11 May 1998; Label: Chrysalis; Formats: CD, 2xCD, 2xLP, MC	2	7	12	26	90	1	8	17	11	2	ARIA: Gold; BPI: Gold
B-Sides & Rarities	Released: 22 March 2005; Label: Mute; Formats: 3xCD, digital download	36	38	—	60	67	26	—	60	74	—	
Lovely Creatures: The Best of Nick Cave and the Bad Seeds	Released: 5 May 2017; Label: Mute; Formats: 2xCD, 3xCD+DVD, 3xLP, digital download	8	8	—	10	12	—	15	—	8	2	BPI: Silver
B-Sides & Rarities Part II	Released: 22 October 2021; Label: Mute; Formats: 2xCD, 2xLP, digital download	38	16	18	19	17	—	—	—	27	3	
"—" denotes releases that did not chart or were not released in that territory.

== EPs ==
Title	EP details	Peak chart positions					
Title	EP details	AUT	DEN	GER	SWI	UK	UK Indie
European Tour '92	Released: 1992; Label: Mute; Formats: CD; Japan-only release	—	—	—	—	—	—
iTunes Live: London Sessions	Released: 7 April 2008; Label: Mute; Formats: digital download	—	—	—	—	—	—
Distant Sky: Live in Copenhagen	Released: 28 September 2018; Label: Bad Seeds Ltd; Formats: 12", digital download	67	34	82	66	74	8
"—" denotes releases that did not chart or were not released in that territory.

== Singles ==
Title	Year	Peak chart positions										Certifications	Album
Title	Year	AUS	AUT	FIN	GER	NL	NOR	NZ	SWE	UK	UK Indie	Certifications	Album
"In the Ghetto"	1984	—	—	—	—	—	—	—	—	84	1		From Her to Eternity
"Tupelo"	1985	—	—	—	—	—	—	—	—	—	1		The Firstborn Is Dead
"The Singer"	1986	—	—	—	—	—	—	—	—	—	1		Kicking Against the Pricks
"The Mercy Seat"	1988	—	—	—	—	—	—	—	—	86	3		Tender Prey
"Deanna"	1988	—	—	—	—	—	—	—	—	—	4		Tender Prey
"The Ship Song"	1990	138	—	—	—	—	—	—	—	84	—		The Good Son
"The Weeping Song"	1990	172	—	—	—	—	—	—	—	—	—		The Good Son
"Straight to You"/"Jack the Ripper"	1992	96	—	—	—	—	—	—	—	68	7		Henry's Dream
"I Had a Dream, Joe"	1992	75	—	—	—	—	—	—	—	85	7		Henry's Dream
"Do You Love Me?"	1994	62	—	—	—	—	—	—	—	68	6		Let Love In
"Loverman"	1994	109	—	—	—	—	—	—	—	88	8		Let Love In
"Red Right Hand"	1994	124	—	—	—	—	—	—	—	—	16	BPI: Silver	Let Love In
"Where the Wild Roses Grow" (with Kylie Minogue)	1995	2	4	5	12	9	3	11	3	11	1	ARIA: Gold; BVMI: Gold	Murder Ballads
"Henry Lee" (with PJ Harvey)	1996	73	—	15	—	—	—	—	33	36	7		Murder Ballads
"Into My Arms"	1997	26	—	10	—	—	8	41	46	53	9	BPI: Silver	The Boatman's Call
"(Are You) The One That I've Been Waiting For"	1997	159	—	—	—	—	—	—	—	67	10		The Boatman's Call
"As I Sat Sadly by Her Side"	2001	80	24	20	—	71	11	—	46	42	6		No More Shall We Part
"Fifteen Feet of Pure White Snow"	2001	—	—	—	—	—	—	—	—	52	5		No More Shall We Part
"Love Letter"	2002	86	—	—	—	—	—	—	—	—	—		No More Shall We Part
"Bring It On"	2003	131	—	—	—	—	—	—	—	58	8		Nocturama
"He Wants You"/"Babe, I'm on Fire"	2003	154	—	—	—	—	—	—	—	—	—		Nocturama
"Rock of Gibraltar"	2003	—	—	—	—	—	—	—	—	136	—		Nocturama
"Nature Boy"	2004	88	17	16	89	—	—	—	—	37	—		Abattoir Blues / The Lyre of Orpheus
"Breathless"/"There She Goes My Beautiful World"	2004	109	—	—	—	—	—	—	—	45	—		Abattoir Blues / The Lyre of Orpheus
"Get Ready for Love"	2005	134	—	—	—	—	—	—	—	62	—		Abattoir Blues / The Lyre of Orpheus
"Dig, Lazarus, Dig!!!"	2008	116	—	—	—	—	—	—	—	66	—		Dig, Lazarus, Dig!!!
"More News from Nowhere"	2008	—	—	—	—	—	—	—	—	171	—		Dig, Lazarus, Dig!!!
"Midnight Man"	2008	—	—	—	—	—	—	—	—	—	—		Dig, Lazarus, Dig!!!
"We No Who U R"	2012	—	—	—	—	69	—	—	—	—	—		Push the Sky Away
"Jubilee Street"	2013	—	—	—	—	—	—	—	—	—	—		Push the Sky Away
"Mermaids"	2013	—	—	—	—	—	—	—	—	—	—		Push the Sky Away
"Animal X"	2013	—	—	—	—	—	—	—	—	—	—		Non-album singles
"Give Us a Kiss"	2014	—	—	—	—	—	—	—	—	—	—		Non-album singles
"Jesus Alone"	2016	—	—	—	—	—	—	—	—	—	—		Skeleton Tree
"Skeleton Tree"	2016	—	—	—	—	—	—	—	—	—	—		Skeleton Tree
"I Need You"	2017	—	—	—	—	—	—	—	—	—	—		Skeleton Tree
"Rings of Saturn"	2017	—	—	—	—	—	—	—	—	—	—		Skeleton Tree
"Frogs"	2024	—	—	—	—	—	—	—	—	—	—		Wild God
"Long Dark Night"	2024	—	—	—	—	—	—	—	—	—	—		Wild God
"Final Rescue Attempt"	2025	—	—	—	—	—	—	—	—	—	—		Wild God
"—" denotes releases that did not chart or were not released in that territory.

== Other charted songs ==
Title	Year	Peak chart positions	Album
Title	Year	NZ Hot	Album
"Song of the Lake"	2024	29	Wild God

== Other appearances ==
=== Studio ===
Year	Song	Album	Notes
1989	"Rye Whiskey"	N/A	traditional cover released as a flexidisc with a 1989 issue of Reflex magazine
1991	"Tower of Song"	I'm Your Fan	Leonard Cohen cover
1991	"(I'll Love You) Till the End of the World"	Until the End of the World	original song

=== Live ===
Year	Song	Album	Notes
1984	"I Put a Spell on You"	Department of Enjoyment	radio broadcast of Screamin' Jay Hawkins cover, as Nick Cave and the Cavemen
2003	"I Feel So Good"	The Soul of a Man	J.B. Lenoir cover
2004	"Supernaturally"	The Big Ask Live - Artists Taking Action On Climate Change	Theatre de la Mutualite, Paris, November 2004

== Music videos ==
Year	Title	Director	Album
1984	"In the Ghetto"	Evan English, Paul Goldman	From Her to Eternity
1985	"Tupelo"	Christoph Dreher	The Firstborn Is Dead
1985	"Wanted Man"	Mick Harvey	The Firstborn Is Dead
1986	"The Singer"	Christoph Dreher	Kicking Against the Pricks
1988	"The Mercy Seat"	Christoph Dreher	Tender Prey
1988	"Deanna"	Mick Harvey	Tender Prey
1990	"The Ship Song"	John Hillcoat	The Good Son
1990	"The Weeping Song"	Angela Conway	The Good Son
1992	"Straight to You"	Anton Corbijn	Henry's Dream
1992	"Jack the Ripper"	John Hillcoat	Henry's Dream
1992	"I Had a Dream, Joe"	John Hillcoat	Henry's Dream
1994	"Do You Love Me?"	John Hillcoat	Let Love In
1994	"Loverman"	John Hillcoat	Let Love In
1994	"Red Right Hand"	Jesse Dylan	Let Love In
1995	"Where the Wild Roses Grow" (with Kylie Minogue)	Rocky Schenck	Murder Ballads
1996	"Henry Lee" (with PJ Harvey)	Rocky Schenck	Murder Ballads
1996	"Stagger Lee"	Emma Davis	Murder Ballads
1997	"Into My Arms"	Jonathan Glazer	The Boatman's Call
1997	"(Are You) The One That I've Been Waiting For?"	Angela Conway	The Boatman's Call
2001	"As I Sat Sadly by Her Side"	John Hillcoat	No More Shall We Part
2001	"Fifteen Feet of Pure White Snow"	John Hillcoat	No More Shall We Part
2002	"Love Letter"	Tony Mahony	No More Shall We Part
2003	"Bring It On"	John Hillcoat	Nocturama
2003	"Babe, I'm on Fire"	John Hillcoat	Nocturama
2004	"Nature Boy"	Grant Gee	Abattoir Blues / The Lyre of Orpheus
2004	"Breathless"	Ben Dawkins	Abattoir Blues / The Lyre of Orpheus
2005	"Get Ready for Love"	David Barnard	Abattoir Blues / The Lyre of Orpheus
2008	"Dig, Lazarus, Dig!!!"	Iain Forsyth and Jane Pollard	Dig, Lazarus, Dig!!!
2008	"More News from Nowhere"	Iain Forsyth and Jane Pollard	Dig, Lazarus, Dig!!!
2008	"Midnight Man"	Iain Forsyth and Jane Pollard	Dig, Lazarus, Dig!!!
2008	"Night Of The Lotus Eaters"	Iain Forsyth and Jane Pollard	Dig, Lazarus, Dig!!!
2012	"We No Who U R"	Gaspar Noé	Push the Sky Away
2013	"Jubilee Street"	John Hillcoat	Push the Sky Away
2013	"Higgs Boson Blues"	Iain Forsyth and Jane Pollard	Push the Sky Away
2016	"Jesus Alone"	Andrew Dominik	Skeleton Tree
2016	"I Need You"	Andrew Dominik	Skeleton Tree
2016	"Girl in Amber"	Andrew Dominik	Skeleton Tree
2016	"Magneto"	Andrew Dominik	Skeleton Tree

== Selected list of video and DVD releases ==
- The Road to God Knows Where – US tour documentary film
- Live at the Paradiso – Live in Amsterdam, Netherlands
- Nick Cave and the Bad Seeds: The Videos
- God Is in the House – Live in Lyon, France
- The Abattoir Blues Tour – 2DVD/CD, Live at the Brixton Academy, Hammersmith Apollo, etc.
- 20,000 Days on Earth – 2014 documentary
- One More Time with Feeling – 2016 documentary
