= God Is in the House (Nick Cave album) =

Live album by Nick Cave and the Bad Seeds
- Released: 26 August 2003
- Recorded: 8 June 2001
- Venue: Le Transbordeur
- Genre: Alternative rock
- Length: 140:00

Professional ratings
Review scores
Source	Rating
Allmusic	3/5 stars

God Is in the House is a live concert DVD by Nick Cave and the Bad Seeds, released on 26 August 2003.

== Track listing ==
1. "Do You Love Me?"
2. "Oh My Lord"
3. "Lime Tree Arbour"
4. "Red Right Hand"
5. "As I Sat Sadly By Your Side"
6. "The Weeping Song"
7. "God Is In The House"
8. "We Came Along This Road"
9. "Papa Won’t Leave You, Henry"
10. "Hallelujah"
11. "The Mercy Seat"
12. "Into My Arms"
13. "Saint Huck"
14. "The Curse Of Millhaven"
15. "No More Shall We Part – The Recording Sessions"
16. "As I Sat Sadly By Your Side"
17. "Fifteen Feet of Pure White Snow"
18. "Love Letter"

== Personnel ==
- Martyn P. Casey – Bass
- Thomas Wydler – Drums
- Blixa Bargeld Guitar, vocals
- Mick Harvey – Guitar, vocals
- Conway Savage – Keyboards, vocals
- Jim Sclavunos – Percussion, organ
- Warren Ellis – Violin
- Nick Cave – Vocals, piano
