= Live Seeds =

Live album by Nick Cave and the Bad Seeds
- Released: 6 September 1993
- Recorded: 1992–1993; Australia, Europe
- Length: 60:35
- Label: Mute
- Producers: Nick Cave and the Bad Seeds

Nick Cave and the Bad Seeds chronology
Henry's Dream (1992)	Live Seeds (1993)	Let Love In (1994)

Live Seeds is the first official live album by Australian post-punk band Nick Cave and the Bad Seeds. The album was recorded live from 1992 to 1993 during various concerts throughout Europe and Australia in support of their 1992 studio album Henry's Dream. Frontman Nick Cave wanted to give the songs a raw feeling as originally intended before production problems occurred. Live Seeds includes a not previously studio-recorded track, "Plain Gold Ring", which is a cover of a song performed by Nina Simone.

== Background ==
Live Seeds was a live album recorded from 1992 to 1993 by Australian post-punk band, Nick Cave and the Bad Seeds at various concerts throughout Europe and Australia. The band had formed in 1983 with a line-up including Nick Cave on lead vocals, Mick Harvey (initially on drums) on guitar, Blixa Bargeld on guitar and Barry Adamson on bass guitar. Soon after the release and subsequent tour for 1988's Tender Prey, Cave began experimenting with piano-driven ballads, resulting in 1990's The Good Son. Seeped in sorrow and longing, the comparatively refined and understated album was well-received critically and commercially, yielding the singles "The Weeping Song" and "The Ship Song".

In 1990, two Australian musicians joined, Martyn Casey (The Triffids) on bass guitar and Conway Savage on keyboards. Their next album, 1992's Henry's Dream, marked a step back to harder rock, utilising producer David Briggs (Neil Young). The album's tour is documented on Live Seeds and showcases the new group's aggressive yet accomplished sound. The live album was produced by the band. Sound engineer and mixer Tony Cohen said that the lead vocals were overdubbed 'live' in the studio in Melbourne before the album was mixed. He said, "I let the tape roll and Nick sang from start to finish. To his credit, he didn't stop. It was as though he was on stage. Mentally he was. He sang exactly like he would live. Except not as out of breath, or badly out of tune."

In mid-1993, Cave relocated to London where Henry's Dream's follow-up studio album, Let Love In, was recorded and released in 1994.

== Reception ==
Professional ratings
Review scores
Source	Rating
AllMusic	4/5 stars
NME	6/10
Q	4/5 stars
The Rolling Stone Album Guide	4/5 stars

AllMusic's Ned Raggett review of Live Seeds noted that "some fans consider many of the songs on [this album] to be superior to their studio equivalent – a testament to its overall quality". He felt that "few cuts differ drastically from the more familiar album versions, but generally everything is crisper, at times much more brusque, perhaps exchanging texture for force".

== Track listing ==
All tracks are written by Nick Cave, except where indicated.

No.	Title	Writer(s)	Length
1.	"The Mercy Seat"	Cave, Mick Harvey	4:43
2.	"Deanna"		4:42
3.	"The Ship Song"		4:18
4.	"Papa Won't Leave You, Henry"		6:28
5.	"Plain Gold Ring"	George Stone	5:03
6.	"John Finn's Wife"		5:43
7.	"Tupelo"	Cave, Barry Adamson, Harvey	6:05
8.	"Brother, My Cup Is Empty"		3:13
9.	"The Weeping Song"		3:59
10.	"Jack the Ripper"		3:49
11.	"The Good Son"		4:27
12.	"From Her to Eternity"	Cave, Anita Lane, Adamson, Blixa Bargeld, Hugo Race, Harvey	4:53
13.	"New Morning"		3:22
Total length:			60:35

== Personnel ==
Nick Cave and the Bad Seeds

- Nick Cave – vocals, organ, piano
- Blixa Bargeld – guitar, backing vocals
- Mick Harvey – guitar, xylophone, backing vocals
- Martyn Casey – bass guitar, backing vocals
- Conway Savage – piano, organ, backing vocals
- Thomas Wydler – drums

Additional musicians

- The Cruel Sea – backing vocals

Production details

- Producer – Nick Cave and the Bad Seeds
- Mixer – Bad Seeds, Tony Cohen
- Studios – mixed at Atlantic Studios, Melbourne, Australia in January–February 1993

Art work

- Layout design – Slim Smith
- Photography – Ute Klaphake, Peter Milne

== Charts ==
1993 weekly chart performance for Live Seeds
Chart (1993)	Peak position
Australian Albums (ARIA)	47
UK Albums (Official Charts)	67

2022 weekly chart performance for Live Seeds
Chart (2022)	Peak position
Belgian Albums (Ultratop Flanders)	58
Dutch Albums (Album Top 100)	88
Portuguese Albums (AFP)	14
