= Total Eclipse of the Sun =

EP by Einstürzende Neubauten
- Released: 1999
- Genre: Experimental music
- Length: 19:08
- Label: Mute (UK), Our Choice (DE)

Total Eclipse of the Sun is a 1999 EP released by the German experimental/industrial band Einstürzende Neubauten. It was their first release recorded with their new line-up featuring Jochen Arbeit and Rudi Moser (formerly of Die Haut) and without FM Einheit (who had left during the sessions for their 1996 album Ende Neu); this has continued to be their line-up since.

== Track listing ==
1. "Total Eclipse of the Sun" - 3:52
2. "Sonnenbarke" (single version) - 8:14
3. "Helium" - 3:10
4. "Total Eclipse of the Sun" (alternate vocal version) - 3:52

== Production ==
The EP was written and composed by Jochen Arbeit, Blixa Bargeld, Alexander Hacke, Rudi Moser, and N.U. Unruh. It was recorded at Conny's Studio, Köln-Wolperath April 1998 and at Schwedenstrasse studio, Berlin in 1999 by Boris Wilsdorf. It was mixed at Hansa studios, Berlin by Boris Wilsdorf in 1999.

== Notes ==
The first track, "Total Eclipse of the Sun", replaces "Anrufe in Abwesenheit" in International (Non-German) copies of their 2000 album Silence Is Sexy.

The third track, "Helium is gravity", later appeared in their Strategies Against Architecture III collection.
