= I Had a Dream, Joe =

Single by Nick Cave and the Bad Seeds

from the album Henry's Dream
- B-side: "The Good Son"
- Released: 31 August 1992
- Recorded: November – December 1991 at Sound City Studios, Van Nuys, CA
- Genre: Post-punk, punk blues
- Length: 3:42
- Label: Mute
- Songwriter(s): Nick Cave
- Producer(s): David Briggs

Nick Cave and the Bad Seeds singles chronology
"Straight to You" (1992)	"I Had a Dream, Joe" (1992)	"What a Wonderful World" (1992)

"I Had a Dream, Joe" is a song by Nick Cave and the Bad Seeds appearing on their 1992 album Henry's Dream. It was released as a single in 1992 by Mute Records.

== Formats and track listing ==
All songs written by Nick Cave.

UK 7" single (MUTE 148)

1. "I Had a Dream, Joe" – 3:42
2. "The Good Son" (live) – 4:35

UK 12" single (12 MUTE 148) and CD single (CD MUTE 148)

1. "I Had a Dream, Joe" – 3:43
2. "The Carny" (live) – 6:06
3. "The Mercy Seat" (live) – 4:40
4. "The Ship Song" (live) – 4:19

== Personnel ==
Adapted from the I Had a Dream, Joe liner notes.

Nick Cave and The Bad Seeds

- Blixa Bargeld – guitar, backing vocals
- Martyn P. Casey – bass guitar, backing vocals
- Nick Cave – lead vocals, mixing
- Mick Harvey – guitar, organ, backing vocals, mixing
- Conway Savage – piano, backing vocals
- Thomas Wydler – drums, backing vocals

Production and additional personnel

- David Briggs – production
- Tony Cohen – engineering, mixing
- Peter Milne – photography

== Charts ==
Chart (1992)	Peak position
Australian Singles Chart	75

== Release history ==
Region	Date	Label	Format	Catalog
United Kingdom	1992	Mute	CD, LP	MUTE 148
