= Falling Joys =

Australian alternative rock band

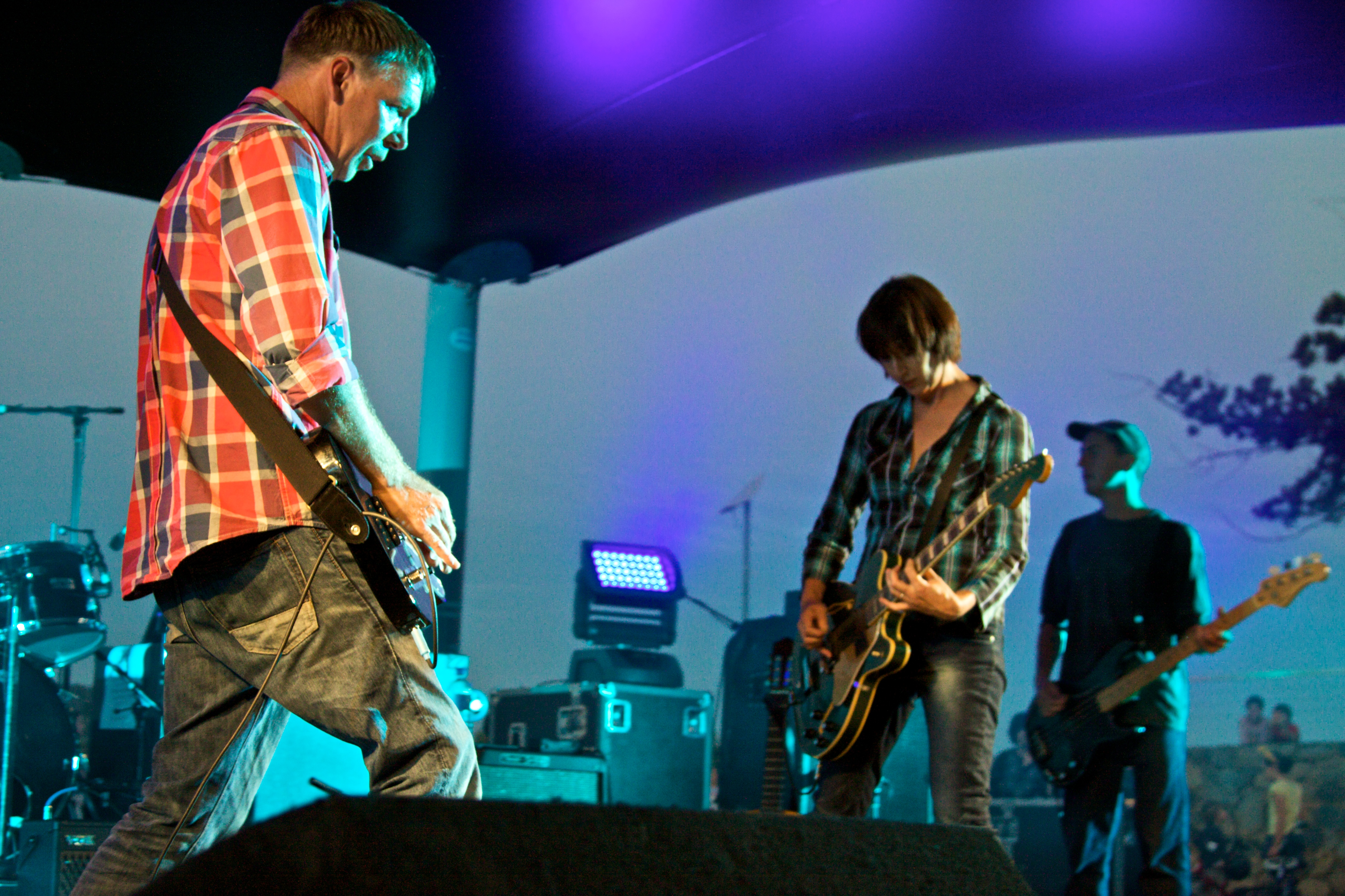
- Falling Joys, L to R: Stuart G. Robertson, Suzie Higgie, Pat Hayes, National Museum of Australia, February 2011

Background information
- Origin: Canberra, Australia Capital Territory, Australia
- Genres: Indie guitar pop; alternative rock; indie pop
- Years active: 1985–1995, 2011, 2016, 2017–present
- Labels: Volition; Volition/Sony
- Members: Suzie Higgie; Stuart G. Robertson; Pat Hayes; Pete Velzen
- Past members: Suzie Higgie; Anthony Merrilees; Robin Miles; Stuart G. Robertson; Andrew McFarlane; Ken Doll; Craig Adam; Pat Hayes; Pete Velzen; Jason Morrisby

Falling Joys are an Australian alternative rock band formed in Canberra in 1985. The original line-up included Suzie Higgie on lead vocals and guitar and Stuart G. Robertson on bass guitar. By the end of 1988 Higgie and Robertson, now on guitar, were joined by Pat Hayes on bass guitar and vocals, and Pete Velzen on drums. They have released three albums, Wish List (1990), Psychohum (1992) and Aerial (1993). Both the latter two albums reached the ARIA Albums Chart Top 50. They disbanded in 1995 but reunited in 2011 and, again, in July 2016.

== History ==
=== 1985–1989: Formation and Omega ===
Falling Joys were formed in Canberra in 1983 by Suzie Higgie on lead vocals and guitar (ex-Get Set Go); Anthony Merrilees on drums; Robin Miles on keyboards and vocals; and Stuart G. Robertson on bass guitar and vocals. They played in the Canberra area and in Sydney and were soon joined by Andrew McFarlane on saxophone.

McFarlane, Merrilees and Miles, all left the band in late 1985: Higgie and Robertson were joined by Ken Doll on drums. In April 1986 the trio played their last Canberra gig, before relocating to Sydney; they co-headlined with fellow Canberra-formed band, the Plunderers, which had moved to Melbourne. With Craig Adam on keyboards Falling Joys recorded a single, "Burnt So Low", in August (co-written by Miles). It was released in January of the following year and the band signed with Volition Records.

By the end of 1988 Higgie and Robertson, now on guitar and vocals, had recruited Pat Hayes on bass guitar and vocals (fellow Canberrans, the Hayes' brothers included Bernie Hayes of Club Hoy and Anthony Hayes aka Stevie Plunder of the Plunderers) and Peter Velzen on drums (aka Pete Pillage, ex-the Plunderers). Bernie Hayes, Anthony Hayes, Pat Hayes and Peter Velzen also performed regularly - most every Sunday night at the Sandringham Hotel in Newtown as the Shout Brothers with a cult following. Robertson worked in videotape operations and Higgie as a vision mixer. The Falling Joys were part of the Duckberg group, a set of independent bands publishing their own record label, and recorded their first few singles under this label. Secret Seven was another of the bands publishing under this label.

Falling Joys next three singles, "Nearly a Sin" (June 1988), "You're in a Mess" (December 1988) and "Tunnel Vision" (July 1989), were followed by their debut extended play, Ω (aka Omega), in November 1989. Australian musicologist, Ian McFarlane, noticed that "Higgie's breathy vocals on these records were just one of the band's trademark sounds." Penelope Layland of The Canberra Times described Omega as "A tempting four-track EP from [the band]. Recent line up changes do not appear to have had a radical effect on the music, which is still dominated by the vocals and song-writing of Suzie Higgie." She felt that "probably the best track on the EP, 'Burnt So Low', [is] an upbeat number with thrumming guitars."

Amanda Lynch, Layland's associate, interviewed Higgie who "draws material from 'every facet of experience' and incorporates these in her songs. 'For instance, I was in an elevator the other day and I hate elevators; I also write about my friends, relationships, and what I do when I get up – there are just so many things to write about'." Lynch opined that "they [are] successful at playing commercially appealing songs that aim at a broad audience... [and] have battled hard to achieve recognition with their bright well-crafted sound that has been branded 'pop with muscle'." In Canberra they had frequently played at the Australian National University (ANU) Refectory Bar. By 1989 the band played frequently at the Annandale Hotel, Sydney. They supported international touring acts, including Buzzcocks in that year.

=== 1990–1992: Wish List & Psychohum ===
The group released their debut studio album, Wish List, in December 1990. The album was "quickly picked up" by youth national radio station, 2JJJ–FM, which "has given the record good rotation." The group had "spent a fortnight in an improvised studio in the Blue Mountains in Wish List's pre-production period, where a handful of the album's songs were written between 'working out whose turn it was to chop the fire wood ... and Suzie cooking lentils." The album reached the top 60 on the ARIA Albums Chart. Eleven of its twelve tracks were produced by Adrian Bolland and Falling Joys, with "You're in a Mess" produced by John Harvey.

Higgie reflected on the group's plans to tour the United States, "When we started out no one wanted to know us but now with us going overseas there are people involved that we don't even know." Bevan Hannan of The Canberra Times reported that they toured North America for six weeks in early 1991 from "Vancouver and winding through Texas, Florida, Washington and New York" which "hasn't jaded the band." Hannan caught their gig at the ANU Refectory in May, "Higgie's energy and delivery is reportedly better than 'A1' class. Stuart Robertson unleashes guitar work which wasn't recorded on Wish List, while bassist Pat Hayes and drummer Pete Velzen have also been sharing some of the lead singing duties."

The lead single from Wish List, "Lock It", peaked at no. 55 on the ARIA Singles Chart in February 1991. Hayes described how it was written, "Suzi did the majority of it. Like I did a bit, Pete did a bit, Stu did a bit and Suzi wrote a melody over it and tied it all together." In 2023, Higgie further explained that the song was written after she met someone out of the blue who she really liked. "I wanted to explore that idea rather than the usual, 'I love you' songs. The thrill of connecting with someone new is one of the most exciting things about falling in love. The person I wrote it about never knew it was about them."

Hannan declared that it "opened the door to a new audience for the four-piece band. The charming tone which Higgie's writing skills address the topic of early love in 'Lock It' extracts true emotion from the band... So often expressions of love interest can be over-the-top but the [group] couldn't put it in a more genuine manner in 'Lock It' – 'Christ, I really like you.'"

The next single, "Jennifer", appeared in April 1991 with a five-track EP released in August 1992. The title track is dedicated to Higgie's sister, Jennifer Higgie. The EP reached the top 60 on the ARIA Singles Chart in September. The group followed with a European tour during 1991 and recorded their second album, Psychohum which was released in May 1992. Psychohum peaked at No. 35 on the ARIA Albums Chart – their highest-charting release.

McFarlane opined that Psychohum was "harder edged" and "yielded three singles: the noisy, guitar-driven pop of 'Black Bandages' (May) and 'Incinerator' (September), plus the ballad 'A Winter's Tale' (March 1993)." Charles Miranda, also of The Canberra Times, felt that "It is a lot different to the band's first album, Wish List, having a more live, 'earthy' sound and flavour – from energetic heavy rock to soft vocaled love songs." They were named most popular independent act at the 1993 Australian Music Awards by local version of Rolling Stone.

=== 1993–1997: Aerial and break up ===
The group's third studio album, Aerial, was released in August 1993 and was produced by Paul McKercher. The group went to Kangaroo Valley, Higgie explained, "We took our studio with us and went to this amazing house in the valley for three weeks, then we mixed it down at a place called Megaphone in Sydney, so we're up to our third album now... I think because of equipment and everything, it is getting easier to go and record anywhere. You've really got to throw yourself into it and it's a great way of doing it. If I got stuck for lyrics I'd just go walking off into the bush and see what I came up with." It reached No. 46 on the ARIA Albums Chart.

McFarlane declared that it was "the band's most accomplished, varied and cohesive release to date." Miranda pointed out that it "oozes relaxed and cohesive diversity. It's simple but still leaves plenty for one to ponder on and is devoid, like the band's music for the past seven years, of conforming commercialism. No doubt it will do brilliantly again." Tharunka's reviewer opined that it "has a laidback, 'organic' feel, and captures that spark which can so often be lost in studio recordings. The album sounds range from pure pop and hard guitar work to rhythm and grooves, producing song offerings which are diverse and yet maintain an indelibly fresh and strong thread throughout."

In July 1994 Velzen was replaced by Jason Morrisby on drums – the latter was recorded on the EP, Universal Mind. According to Hayes, Velzen left due to family commitments, "Pete had twins, so it was a bit of an up-end when it happened because we had shows booked." They played their last gig at Canberra's ANU Bar on 5 October 1995, Higgie declared it would be "one of the last Joys shows for a very very long time." Band members were set "to pursue their own interests for a while, whether it's carpentry, chefing, or studying." Higgie later explained, "It was ten years and we were getting a bit weary. We toured very heavily, very heavily. We’d been to America, we were all just a bit over it and I think we needed to stop." Volition issued a compilation album, Singles, in 2001.

=== 1998–present: Post break-up and reunions ===
In 1998, Suzie Higgie collaborated with keyboardist Conway Savage, a member of Nick Cave and the Bad Seeds, on an album, Soon Will be Tomorrow. Her first solo album, Songs of Habit, was released in 2002. Higgie had another collaboration, with Andrea Croft from the Honeys and Catherine Wheel, which provided a four-track EP, Splinter (1992), which was re-released in 2013. Pat Hayes played bass guitar in the band, Stella One Eleven.

Volition issued a compilation album, Singles, in 2001.

On 26 February 2011 Falling Joys played their first live show in 15 years at the outdoor amphitheatre of the National Museum of Australia, Canberra. The band also played at the Oxford Arts Factory in Sydney on 10 June in that year. Along with The Hummingbirds, the band reunited to play two shows on 2 and 3 July 2016 at the Newtown Social Club, Sydney.

In February 2018, the Falling Joys finished a national tour of Australia with The Clouds.

== Discography ==
=== Albums ===
List of studio albums, with release date and label details shown
Title	Album details	Peak chart positions
Title	Album details	AUS
Wish List	Released: December 1990; Label: Volition (VOLT29); Format: CD, Cassette, LP	51
Psychohum	Released: May 1992; Label: Volition (VOLT59); Formats: CD, Cassette, LP, CD+VHS	35
Aerial	Released: August 1993; Label: Volition (VOLT79); Formats: CD	46

=== Compilation albums ===
List of Compilation albums released, with release date and label details shown
Title	Album details
Singles	Released: November 2001; Label: Volition/ Roadshow (300753-2); Format: CD, digital download
Singles & B-Sides	Released: December 2011; Label: Volition; Format: digital download

=== Extended plays ===
List of EP, with release date and label details shown
Title	Details
Ω (aka Omega)	Released: November 1989; Label: Volition (VOLT27); Format: CD
Jennifer	Released: August 1991; Label: Volition (VOLT35); Format: CD, LP
Universal Mind	Released: 1995; Label: Volition (VOLT103); Format: CD

=== Singles ===
List of singles, with year released and selected chart positions
Title	Year	Peak chart positions	Album
Title	Year	AUS	Album
"Burnt So Low"	1987	—	Ω
"Nearly a Sin"	1988	—	Non-album singles
"You're in a Mess"/"Oyster Hill"	1988	—	Non-album singles
"Tunnel Vision"	1989	—	Ω
"Lock It"	1990	55	Wish List
"Jennifer"	1991	60	Wish List
"Black Bandages"	1992	100	Psychohum
"Incinerator"	1992	131	Psychohum
"A Winter's Tale"	1992	147	Psychohum
"Fiesta!"	1993	102	Aerial
"Breakaway"	1993	126	Aerial
"Make It Soon"/"Amen"	1994	148	Aerial
"Universal Mind"	1995	118	Universal Mind
"Fight of Your Life"	2013	—	Non-album single
