= God Is in the House =

God Is in the House may refer to:

- God Is in the House (Art Tatum album), 1940–41 [1973]
- God Is in the House (Hillsong Church album), 1996
- God Is in the House (Nick Cave album), 2001 [2003]
