= Burnin' the Ice =

Studio album by Die Haut
- Released: 1983
- Recorded: December 1982
- Studio: Studio West (Aachen)
- Length: 29:23
- Label: Paradoxx
- Producer: Die Haut

Die Haut chronology
Schnelles Leben (1982)	Burnin' the Ice (1983)	Headless Body in Topless Bar (1988)

Burnin' the Ice is a studio album by the German band Die Haut, featuring collaborations with Nick Cave. It was released in 1983 by record label Paradoxx.

== Critical reception ==
Professional ratings
Review scores
Source	Rating
AllMusic	3/5 stars
Exclaim!	mixed
Uncut	3/5

Exclaim! wrote that the album "serves to be a powerful auditory snapshot of that particular era of artistic creation in Berlin, if nothing more."

== Track listing ==
All lyrics are written by Nick Cave.

Side A
No.	Title	Music	Length
1.	"Stow-a-Way"	Christoph Dreher; Thomas Wydler	7:14
2.	"Tokyo-Express"	Dreher; Wydler	2:57
3.	"Truck Love"	Dreher; Wydler	3:51
Total length:			14:02

Side B
No.	Title	Music	Length
1.	"The Victory"	Dreher; Wydler; Martin Peter; Remo Park	3:43
2.	"Pleasure Is the Boss"	Dreher; Wydler; Peter; Park	3:50
3.	"Dumb Europe"	Dreher	6:30
4.	"This Flame Will Never Die"	Dreher; Wydler	1:18
Total length:			15:21

== Personnel ==
- Nick Cave – vocals on "Stow-a-Way", "Truck Love", "Pleasure Is the Boss" and "Dumb Europe"
- Martin Peter, Remo Park – guitar
- Christoph Dreher – bass
- Thomas Wydler – drums

with:

- Susanne Kuhnke – bass synthesizer on "Stow-a-Way"

Technical

- Rainer Rulow – engineer
- Yadegar Asisi Namini – cover
