= Higgie =

Higgie is a surname. Notable people with the surname include:

- Jennifer Higgie (born 1962), Australian writer
- Mark Higgie (born 1957), Australian diplomat, political advisor, and intelligence analyst
- Megan Higgie (born 1977), New Zealand-born, Australian-based scientist and academic
- Suzie Higgie, Australian musician
- Caitlin Higgie, New Zealand virtual assistant
