= The Mirror and the Palette =

2021 non-fiction book by Jennifer Higgie

- First edition (UK)
- Author: Jennifer Higgie
- Language: English
- Genre: Non-fiction
- Publisher: Weidenfeld & Nicolson
- Publication date: 2021
- Publication place: United Kingdom
- ISBN: 978-1-64313-803-9

The Mirror and the Palette: Rebellion, Revolution, and Resilience: Five Hundred Years of Women's Self Portraits is a 2021 book by Jennifer Higgie about self-portraits painted by women since the 16th century.

It was published in 2021 by Weidenfeld & Nicolson in the United Kingdom and Pegasus Books, an imprint of Simon & Schuster in the United States. It is 336 pages in length.

Artists featured in The Mirror and the Palette include Rita Angus, Artemisia Gentileschi, Nora Heysen, Angelica Kauffman, Frida Kahlo, Alice Neel, Helene Schjerfbeck and Suzanne Valadon.
