= Red Right Hand =

1994 single by Nick Cave and the Bad Seeds

Single by Nick Cave and the Bad Seeds

from the album Let Love In
- B-side: "That's What Jazz Is to Me"; "Where the Action Is"
- Released: 24 October 1994
- Recorded: September – December 1993
- Genre: Southern gothic; blues; gothic folk; gothic rock
- Length: 6:10 (album version); 4:46 (single edit)
- Label: Mute
- Songwriters: Nick Cave; Mick Harvey; Thomas Wydler
- Producer: Tony Cohen

Nick Cave and the Bad Seeds singles chronology
"Loverman" (1994)	"Red Right Hand" (1994)	"Where the Wild Roses Grow" (1995)

Let Love In track listing
- 1. "Do You Love Me?"; 2. "Nobody's Baby Now"; 3. "Loverman"; 4. "Jangling Jack"; 5. "Red Right Hand"; 6. "I Let Love In"; 7. "Thirsty Dog"; 8. "Ain't Gonna Rain Anymore"; 9. "Lay Me Low"; 10. "Do You Love Me? Pt 2"

"Red Right Hand" is a song by the Australian rock band Nick Cave and the Bad Seeds. It was released as a single from their eighth studio album Let Love In (1994) on 24 October 1994 by Mute Records. An edited version was included on the single, while the longer version was included on the album. The title comes from John Milton's epic poem Paradise Lost (1667), in which it refers to the vengeful hand of God.

The song has become one of Nick Cave's signature songs, being performed at most of his concerts; only "The Mercy Seat" has appeared in more of his live sets since 1984. It has since become best known for its use in the Scream film series and later as the theme song to the British period crime drama TV series Peaky Blinders, which resulted in the song receiving a re-release single in 2014. It has been covered by ex-partner PJ Harvey, Arctic Monkeys, Iggy Pop, Pete Yorn, Jarvis Cocker and Snoop Dogg, among others. In 2005, Cave was a guest performer on his former girlfriend Anita Lane's cover of the song.

== Background ==
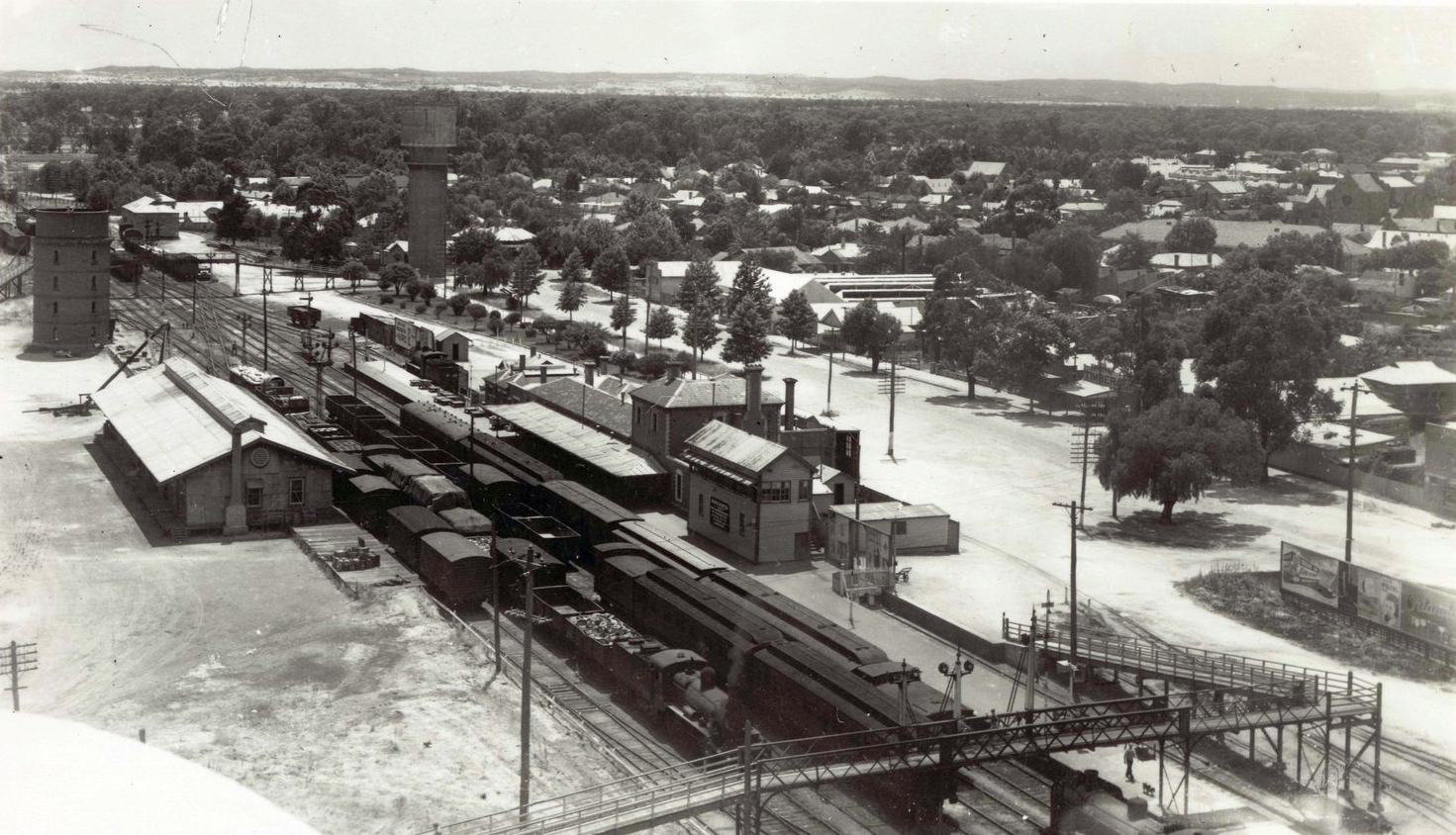
The town described in the song is loosely based on Cave's hometown of Wangaratta. (Pictured: Wangaratta railway station, 1954).

The liner notes for Murder Ballads state that the phrase "red right hand" is from a line in John Milton's epic poem Paradise Lost that refers to divine vengeance. The opening song on the album, "Song of Joy," states of a murderer: "It seems he has done many, many more, / quotes John Milton on the walls in the victim's blood. / The police are investigating at tremendous cost. / In my house he wrote 'his red right hand'. / That, I'm told, is from Paradise Lost."

The aforementioned appearance in Paradise Lost (Book II, 170-174) is: "What if the breath that kindled those grim fires, / Awaked, should blow them into sevenfold rage, / And plunge us in the flames; or from above / Should intermitted vengeance arm again / His red right hand to plague us?" The term itself appears to be Milton's translation of the term "rubente dextera" in Horace's Ode I.2,2-3.

Co-writer Mick Harvey recalled that the song originated during the songwriting process for the band's 1994 album Let Love In. The lyrics describe "a shadowy, alluring, and manipulative figure, stalking the land and striking a combination of fear and awe everywhere he goes" who is "seemingly part deity, part demon". While writing the lyrics, Cave "filled an entire notebook" with descriptions of the town the song is set in, "including maps and sketches of prominent buildings, virtually none of which made it into the lyrics." Cave later said that the town and landscape depicted in the song is a "reconstructed" version of Wangaratta, his hometown. Biographer Mark Mordue notes that it is "still somewhere real enough for those lyrics to serve as a map that could guide you from one point to another with an eerie familiarity."

In 2004, researcher Kim Beissel claimed that "Red Right Hand" was loosely based on the 1987 Tom Waits song "Way Down in the Hole".

== Critical reception ==
"Red Right Hand" is widely regarded as one of Cave's best songs. In 2020, Far Out ranked the song number five on their list of the 20 greatest Nick Cave songs, and in 2023, Mojo ranked the song number six on their list of the 30 greatest Nick Cave songs. In 2025, the song ranked 98 on the Triple J Hottest 100 of Australian Songs.

== Music video ==
The accompanying music video for "Red Right Hand" was directed by American director Jesse Dylan and produced by Liz Friedlander for DNA. It was released on 17 October 1994 and features the band playing creepy house guests with a destructive bent.

== Film and television ==
=== Advertising ===
- The song was used in the South Australian Tourism Board's Barossa Valley television commercial campaign, Barossa, Be Consumed, directed by Jeffrey Darling.
- The song was used by New York design firm GrandArmy in a promotional clip for the Mexican tequila company El Jimador.

=== Films and soundtracks ===
- Dumb and Dumber (1994 film)
- Songs in the Key of X: Music from and Inspired by the X-Files (1996)
- Scream (1996 film)
- Box of Moonlight (1996)
- Hellboy (2004), the song appears on the soundtrack in a cover version by Pete Yorn
- Cirque du Freak: The Vampire's Assistant (2009)
- Jack Irish: Bad Debts (2012)
- Peaky Blinders (2013–2022), title track of the show – the album version and several cover versions have been played
  - Peaky Blinders: The Immortal Man (2026) a version was made for this film.
- Wentworth (2019–2021)
- The Lost City (2022)
- Dexter: Resurrection (2025)

=== Scream franchise ===
- The song was used in the first three films in the Scream franchise, as well as in the fifth, sixth and seventh installments of the series. Scream 4 stands as the only film in the franchise not to feature the song. The original version appeared on the soundtrack album for the first film in 1996, while a remixed version by DJ Spooky appears on the Scream 2 (1997) album.
- Nick Cave recorded another version, sometimes referred to as "Red Right Hand 2", for Scream 3 (2000) and released it on his 3CD compilation album, B-Sides & Rarities (2005).

=== Television ===
- The song was used in the 1994 The X-Files episode "Ascension", playing during Duane Barry's car ride, with Dana Scully in the trunk. In the liner notes for the compilation album, Songs in the Key of X: Music from and Inspired by the X-Files (1996) The X-Files producer Chris Carter explained that the song was the direct inspiration for the anthology.
- It was used as the main theme for the BBC television show Peaky Blinders. A version by popular English rock band Arctic Monkeys appeared in episode 3 of series 2, a version by US punk and garage rock band Fidlar in the opening episode of series 4, and a cover by British folk singer Laura Marling in the season 4 finale.
- The song was the main theme song for ABC television program Jack Irish, starring Guy Pearce.
- The song was used in the Apple TV+ television sports comedy-drama show Ted Lasso episode "International Break".
- The song was used in the first episode of "Dexter: Resurrection".

== Cover versions ==
- English indie rock band Arctic Monkeys performed a cover version of "Red Right Hand" during their tour of Australia in early 2009, their performance in the Reading and Leeds Festival in August 2009, as well as in their North American tour in December 2009. A recorded version of the song appears on the Japanese version of their third studio album, Humbug (2009) and as a B-side on the single "Crying Lightning" (2009).
- Canadian singer Nell Smith and American band The Flaming Lips covered the song on their album Where the Viaduct Looms (2021).
- Giant Sand covered the song on their album Cover Magazine (2002).
- Various artists have covered the track for the television series Peaky Blinders, including Anna Calvi, PJ Harvey, Laura Marling, Patti Smith, Iggy Pop & Jarvis Cocker, and Snoop Dogg.

== Track listing ==
- Euro three-track CD single
1. "Red Right Hand"
2. "That's What Jazz Is to Me"
3. "Where the Action Is"

== Personnel ==
Nick Cave and the Bad Seeds

- Nick Cave – vocals; organ; oscillator
- Blixa Bargeld – guitar
- Martyn P. Casey – bass guitar
- Mick Harvey – guitar; bells; shaker
- Thomas Wydler – drums; timpani; temple block (fish)

== Charts ==
1994 chart performance for "Red Right Hand"
Chart (1994)	Peak position
Australia (ARIA)	124
UK Indie (OCC)	16

2022 chart performance for "Red Right Hand"
Chart (2022)	Peak position
Hungary (Single Top 40)	26

== Certifications ==
Certifications for "Red Right Hand"
Region	Certification	Certified units/sales
United Kingdom (BPI)	Silver	200,000^{‡}
^{‡} Sales+streaming figures based on certification alone.
