= Straight to You =

Single by Nick Cave and the Bad Seeds

from the album Henry's Dream
- B-side: "Jack the Ripper"
- Released: 30 March 1992
- Recorded: November – December 1991 at Sound City Studios, Van Nuys, CA
- Genre: Post-punk, punk blues
- Length: 4:34
- Label: Mute
- Songwriter(s): Nick Cave
- Producer(s): David Briggs

Nick Cave and the Bad Seeds singles chronology
"The Weeping Song" (1990)	"Straight to You" (1992)	"I Had a Dream, Joe" (1992)

"Straight to You" is a song by Nick Cave and the Bad Seeds appearing on their 1992 album Henry's Dream. It was released as a single in 1992 by Mute Records. It charted at no. 68 in the UK and no. 96 in Australia. It gained both contemporary and retrospective critical acclaim.

== Critical reception ==
Upon its release, Simon Price of Melody Maker picked "Straight to You" as the magazine's "single of the week". He described the song as "a deliverance hymn" and "a desperate plea for refuge in the face of global catastrophe". He added, "Cave 'oversings' every word (of course), transcending the thin line between stylised Las Vegas camp and absolute sincerity, while The Bad Seeds use C&W mannerisms to create a mood that is pure Gospel."

== Accolades ==
Year	Publication	Country	Accolade	Rank
1992	NME	United Kingdom	Singles of the Year	12
1992	Select	United Kingdom	Singles of the Year	47
2014	NME	United Kingdom	500 Greatest Songs of All Time	218

== Formats and track listing ==
All songs written by Nick Cave.

UK 7" single (MUTE 140)

1. "Straight to You" – 4:34
2. "Jack the Ripper" – 2:47

UK CD single (CD MUTE 140), 12" single (12 MUTE 140)

1. "Straight to You" – 4:34
2. "Jack the Ripper" – 3:44
3. "Blue Bird" – 2:46

== Personnel ==
Adapted from the Straight to You liner notes.

Nick Cave and The Bad Seeds

- Blixa Bargeld – guitar, backing vocals
- Martyn P. Casey – bass guitar, backing vocals
- Nick Cave – lead vocals, mixing
- Mick Harvey – guitar, piano, organ, drums, mixing
- Thomas Wydler – percussion

Production and additional personnel

- David Briggs – production
- Tony Cohen – engineering, mixing
- Anton Corbijn – photography, art direction
- Chuck Johnson – engineering

== Charts ==
Chart (1992)	Peak position
UK Singles Chart	68
Australian Singles Chart	96

== Release history ==
Region	Date	Label	Format	Catalog
United Kingdom	1992	Mute	CD, 7", 12"	(CD/12) MUTE 140
