= (Are You) The One That I've Been Waiting For =

"(Are You) The One That I've Been Waiting For?"

Single by Nick Cave and the Bad Seeds

from the album The Boatman's Call
- B-side: "Come Into My Sleep"
- Released: 19 May 1997
- Recorded: July 1996
- Studio: Sarm West and Abbey Road Studios, London, United Kingdom
- Genre: Alternative rock
- Length: 4:05
- Label: Mute Records
- Songwriter: Nick Cave
- Producers: Nick Cave & the Bad Seeds, Mark Ellis

Nick Cave and the Bad Seeds singles chronology
"Into My Arms" (1997)	"(Are You) The One That I've Been Waiting For?" (1997)	"As I Sat Sadly by Her Side" (2001)

"(Are You) The One That I've Been Waiting For?" is the second single from the album The Boatman's Call by Nick Cave and the Bad Seeds. The single, released on 19 May 1997, was pressed on 7" and 12" vinyl, as well as a standard CD single, though the song failed to chart anywhere except the U.K., where it only made it to #67. A promotional music video for the song was also recorded.

It was made NME's single of the week, with writer James Oldham calling it "sparse and profoundingly movingful".

== Track listing ==
UK and Australian CD single (Liberation Records, D1626)

1. "(Are You) The One That I've Been Waiting For?" – 4:06
2. "Come Into My Sleep" – 3:48
3. "Black Hair" (band version) – 4:14
4. "Babe, I Got You Bad" – 3:49

UK 7" single (Mute Records, MUTE 206)

1. "(Are You) The One That I've Been Waiting For?" – 4:06
2. "Come Into My Sleep" – 3:48

== Music video ==
Before the single's release, a promotional music video for the song was recorded. The video features the band performing the song in a small church hall.

== Charts ==
Chart performance for "(Are You) The One That I've Been Waiting For"
Chart (1997)	Peak position
Australia (ARIA)	159
UK Singles (OCC)	67
