= Suzie Higgie =

Australian musician

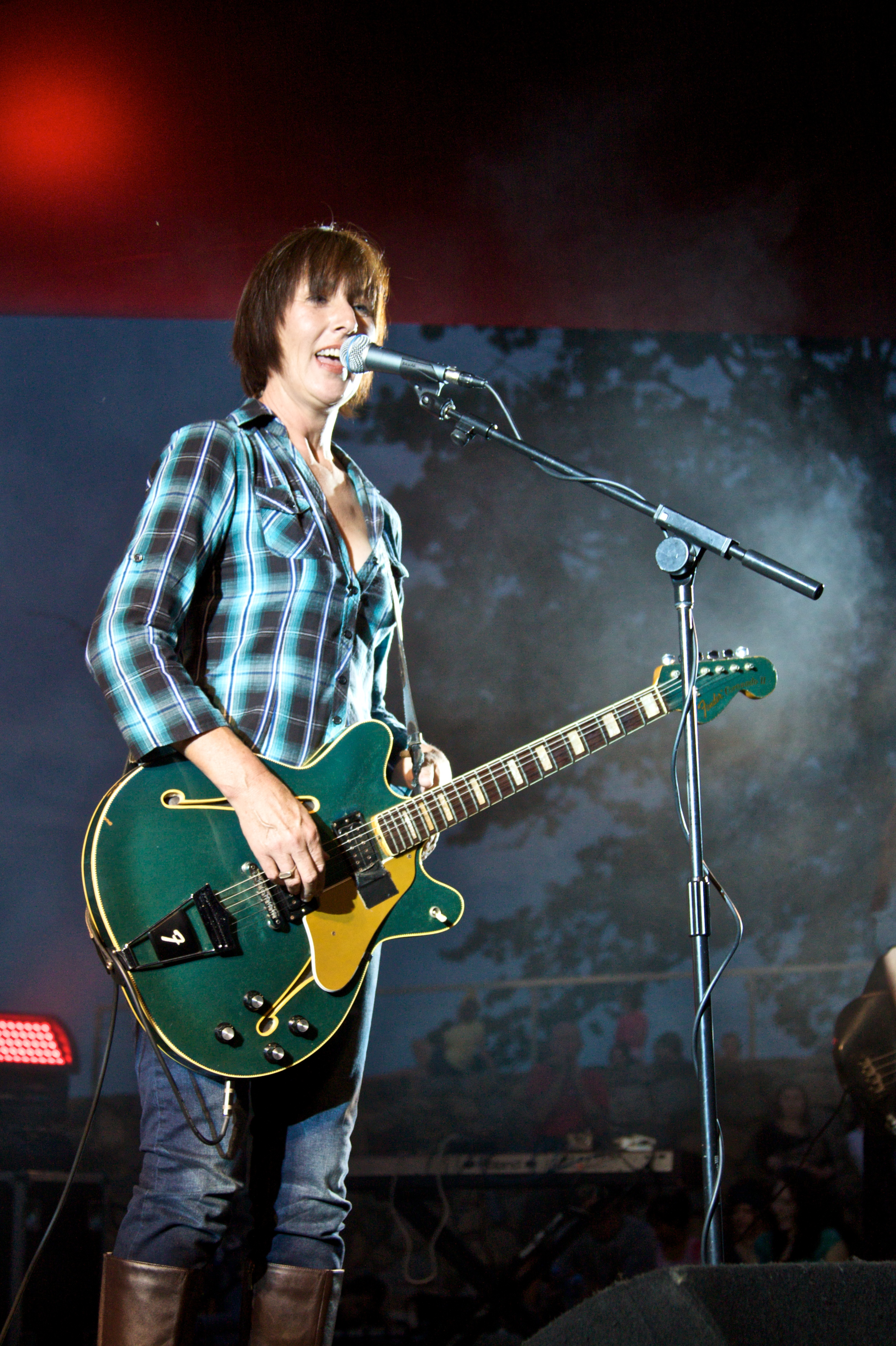
- Performing with Falling Joys, National Museum of Australia, Canberra, February 2011

Background information
- Origin: Canberra, Australian Capital Territory, Australia
- Years active: 1984–present
- Labels: Anchor & Hope/Shock

Suzie Higgie is an Australian musician. She is the founding mainstay lead singer, guitarist and songwriter of the Falling Joys, an alternative rock band formed in Canberra. She has issued two solo albums, Soon Will Be Tomorrow (collaboration with Conway Savage, June 1998) and Songs of Habit (October 2001).

== Biography ==
=== Early life ===
Suzie Higgie is the daughter of William Alexander "Bill" Higgie (1923 – 2015), a Department of Immigration diplomat, and Jean Winifred née Stenhouse, from the same department. Her older brother, Mark Higgie, is a diplomat, political advisor and former intelligence analyst. Her younger sister, Jenny Higgie, is a novelist, screenwriter, art critic and co-editor of the London-based contemporary arts magazine, Frieze. Her younger brother, Andrew Higgie, is a London-based theatre and TV producer.

After Higgie attended a boarding school in England, the family relocated successively to Yugoslavia, Italy, France and back to Australia. In Canberra she completed her degree in communication and history before working short terms in an Israeli kibbutz and an Austrian ski resort. Back in Canberra, Higgie and Jenny were members of a folk-pop group, Get Set Go, from mid-1983 to mid-1984, with Nic Dalton and Anthony Hayes (later known as Stevie Plunder). Higgie later recalled, "[d]own at Commonwealth Park there used to be a tunnel with a power point ... My first band with Nic Dalton and Stevie Plunder... we wrote most of our songs down there."

=== Falling Joys era ===
In 1985 Higgie, as lead singer and guitarist, formed Falling Joys, an indie guitar pop group, in Canberra, with Anthony Merrilees on drums; Robin Miles on keyboards and vocals; and Stuart G. Robertson on bass guitar and vocals. Late that year Higgie and Robertson were joined by Ken Doll on drums and the trio played their last Canberra gig before relocating to Sydney in April of the following year. Their debut single, "Burnt so Low", appeared in January 1987, which was co-written by Higgie and Robertson.

Falling Joys' debut extended play, Omega, appeared in November 1989. Penelope Layland of The Canberra Times observed, "A tempting four-track EP from [the band]. Recent line up changes do not appear to have had a radical effect on the music, which is still dominated by the vocals and song-writing of Suzie Higgie." According to Australian musicologist, Ian McFarlane, the group's recent singles and the EP, "gained the band many new fans. Higgie's breathy vocals on these records were just one of the band's trademark sounds."

One of their singles, "Jennifer", appeared in April 1991 with a five-track EP version also available. The title track is dedicated to Higgie's sister, Jennifer Higgie. A live version also appeared as Jennifer – The Live EP, which reached the top 60 on the ARIA Singles Chart in September. The group issued three studio albums, Wish List (November 1990), Psychohum (May 1992) and Aerial (August 1993), before disbanding in 1995.

Higgie has participated in reformations of the group, including touring in February and June 2011 and early July 2016. In November 2017 Falling Joys reunited for an Australian tour.

=== Solo works ===
Higgie's first solo album, Soon Will Be Tomorrow, is a collaboration with Conway Savage (from Nick Cave and the Bad Seeds). She had started work on the "low-key and low-fi album of soft-hued country'n'blues tunes" in 1996, which was released in June 1998 via Anchor & Hope/Shock Records. Higgie provided lead vocals, guitar and bass guitar; while Savage played piano, organ and keyboards as well as singing. It was recorded by Matt Crosbie at Exeter House, Mount Victoria and co-produced by Higgie and Crosbie. McFarlane described how, "To promote this album of sparse folk/pop tunes and quiet love songs, Higgie and Savage undertook a low-key tour."

The singer-songwriter later recalled, "I wanted to do something really, you know, laid back... I had a few songs that I'd already written, and because my partner Matt [Crosbie], he's been Nick Cave's live engineer for over twenty years, so I'd got to know the guys through him, I heard Conway [Savage]'s piano playing and got to know his stuff he did and I thought, 'That's something different, let's get together with Conway, if he's interested.'… And that's pretty much how it came about."

Songs of Habit (October 2001) is Higgie's second album. According to Jon Casimir of The Sydney Morning Herald, "[it] began life as a series of titles in search of songs. Wanting to challenge herself, she decided to try writing a concept album, loosely based around habits (nuns' habits, drug habits, unconscious and involuntary habits)... There are folk, country and soul echoes, even a hint of lounge music. There are electronic and acoustic songs. But mostly, it's just a collection of tender, warm melodies, the kind of record that is perfectly out of step with everything fashionable in pop and all the richer for it." AllMusic's Richie Unterberger opined, "[its] music suggestive of the moods of those between relationships, keeping pretty much to themselves as they drift through the day in relative reclusion, then sitting alone in smoky bars and clubs at night."

Soon Will Be Tomorrow was re-released in April 2012: Higgie and Savage performed the album live in concert.

=== Private life ===
Higgie's domestic partner, Matt Crosbie, was the front-of-house audio engineer for Nick Cave and the Bad Seeds, and they have two children. They lived in Mount Victoria, then Bowral and then moved to the United Kingdom in 2000.

Higgie, Crosbie and children returned to Bowral in mid-2009. By November 2017 the couple had divorced and Higgie was living in Canberra working at the National Museum – she "designs music workshops for people with mixed abilities, whether that involves preschool children or aged Alzheimer's disease sufferers."

Her niece, Anna Higgie, is a Bristol-based illustrator and street artist.

== Discography ==
=== Albums ===
- Soon Will Be Tomorrow (by Suzie Higgie and Conway Savage) (June 1998) – Anchor & Hope/Shock Records (AH004CD)
- Songs of Habit (16 October 2001) Anagram (CDBRED 196)
