= Do You Love Me? (Nick Cave and the Bad Seeds song) =

Single by Nick Cave and the Bad Seeds

from the album Let Love In
- B-side: "Cassiels Song"
- Released: 28 March 1994
- Recorded: September – December 1993
- Genre: Post-punk; gothic rock; dark cabaret; anti-folk; punk blues; neo-psychedelia
- Length: 5:56
- Label: Mute
- Songwriters: Martyn P. Casey, Nick Cave
- Producer: Tony Cohen

Nick Cave and the Bad Seeds singles chronology
"What a Wonderful World" (1992)	"Do You Love Me?" (1994)	"Loverman" (1994)

"Do You Love Me?" is a song by Nick Cave and the Bad Seeds appearing on their album Let Love In. It was released as a single on 28 March 1994 by Mute Records.

== Accolades ==
Year	Publication	Country	Accolade	Rank
1994	NME	United Kingdom	Singles of the Year	35
1994	Rock de Lux	Spain	Songs of the Year	18

== Formats and track listing ==
All songs written by Nick Cave, except where noted.

UK 7" single (MUTE 160)

1. "Do You Love Me?" (Martyn P. Casey, Nick Cave) – 4:40
2. "Cassiels Song" – 3:34
3. "Sail Away" – 4:40

German CD single (INT 892.933)

1. "Do You Love Me?" (Martyn P. Casey, Nick Cave) – 4:37
2. "Cassiels Song" – 3:34
3. "Sail Away" – 4:36
4. "Do You Love Me? – Part 2" – 6:12

== Personnel ==
Adapted from the Do You Love Me? liner notes.

Nick Cave and The Bad Seeds

- Blixa Bargeld – guitar
- Martyn P. Casey – bass guitar
- Nick Cave – lead vocals, piano, organ
- Mick Harvey – guitar, organ, marimba
- Conway Savage – piano
- Thomas Wydler – drums

Production and additional personnel

- Polly Borland – photography
- Tony Cohen – production, mixing
- Rowland S. Howard – backing vocals
- Tex Perkins – backing vocals

== Charts ==
Chart (1994)	Peak position
Australia (ARIA)	62
Belgium (Ultratop)	44
Israel (Israeli Singles Chart)	24
UK Singles (OCC)	68

== Release history ==
Region	Date	Label	Format	Catalog
United Kingdom	1994	Mute	CD, LP	MUTE 160
