= Loverman =

1994 single by Nick Cave and the Bad Seeds

Single by Nick Cave and the Bad Seeds

from the album Let Love In
- Released: 4 July 1994
- Genre: Alternative rock; post-punk
- Label: Mute
- Songwriter: Nick Cave
- Producer: Tony Cohen

Nick Cave and the Bad Seeds singles chronology
"Do You Love Me?" (1994)	"Loverman" (1994)	"Red Right Hand" (1995)

Let Love In track listing
- 1. "Do You Love Me?"; 2. "Nobody's Baby Now"; 3. "Loverman"; 4. "Jangling Jack"; 5. "Red Right Hand"; 6. "I Let Love In"; 7. "Thirsty Dog"; 8. "Ain't Gonna Rain Anymore"; 9. "Lay Me Low"; 10. "Do You Love Me? Pt 2"

"Loverman" is the second single from the album Let Love In by Australian rock band Nick Cave and the Bad Seeds. The song was also performed by American heavy metal band Metallica on their 1998 cover album Garage Inc. and Depeche Mode's Martin Gore on his 2003 solo album Counterfeit².

== Details ==
Cave said, "'Loverman' was a song we almost didn't do because it seemed like a very weak idea at the time of recording. It was supposed to be just a throwaway song about desire. I was squirming about how banal it was. I changed the whole atmosphere, so the guy who's the telling the story is weak and dysfunctional. I put in the bits where I spell out loverman. It was a great surprise to everyone."

== Track listing ==
=== CD / 12" ===
1. "Loverman" – 4:55
2. "B Side" – 19:20

The back cover states: "'B Side' is a selection of largely improvised, ad-libbed pieces of music recorded direct to DAT by Nick Cave and the Bad Seeds over the last couple of years."

=== 7" ===
1. "Loverman" – 4:55
2. "(I'll Love You) Till the End of the World" – 4:40

The B-side to the 7" single is taken from the soundtrack to the Wim Wenders film Until the End of the World. The German film director Uli M Schueppel made a documentary film, The Song (1990), about the recording of "(I'll Love You) Till the End of the World".

== Charts ==
Chart performance for "Loverman"
Chart (1994)	Peak position
Australia (ARIA)	109
UK Singles (OCC)	88
