= Henry's Dream =

Studio album by Nick Cave and the Bad Seeds
- Released: 27 April 1992
- Recorded: November–December 1991
- Studio: Sound City Studios (Van Nuys, California)
- Genre: Punk blues
- Length: 41:33
- Label: Mute
- Producer: David Briggs

Nick Cave and the Bad Seeds chronology
The Good Son (1990)	Henry's Dream (1992)	Live Seeds (1993)

Singles from Henry's Dream
- 1. "Straight to You" Released: 30 March 1992; 2. "I Had a Dream, Joe" Released: 31 August 1992

Henry's Dream is the seventh studio album by the Australian rock band Nick Cave and the Bad Seeds, released on 27 April 1992 by Mute Records.

It was the first album to feature long-standing members Martyn P. Casey (bass guitar) and Conway Savage (piano, organ, backing vocals), both Australian. Savage also performs a duet with Cave in the chorus of 'When I First Came to Town'. The album title is a reference to The Dream Songs (1969), a long poem by John Berryman.

== Production ==
Nick Cave himself was unhappy with the production by David Briggs. Briggs preferred a "live-in-the-studio" method he had used with Neil Young. This led to Cave and Mick Harvey re-mixing the album, and ultimately to the Live Seeds (1993) recordings, as Cave wanted the songs "done justice". Cave later said, "He was a fucking nightmare, that guy. I know he's dead now and all, but, fuck, man. I put a lot of energy into the writing of that record, and then for each day to see it drift away… it was a horrible, horrible experience." Tony Cohen, who was engineer for the remix, said, "Briggs pushed them to play better, take after take. The performance was everything. But when it came to the mix, Briggs left all the faders in one spot."

== Songs ==
The lyrics of "Christina the Astonishing" are based on the life of Christina Mirabilis, a 12th-century Christian holy woman, primarily known for her legendary resurrection during her funeral mass, and numerous other miracles attributed to her during her life.

"When I First Came to Town" is based partly on Karen Dalton's recording of the traditional song "Katie Cruel". Dalton's version was later issued on Original Seeds Vol. 1.

Of "Papa Won't Leave You, Henry," Cave said in 2005, "I like that song a lot. That was another one written in Brazil. It's this sprawling, lyrical thing. We were playing that [in 2000] as a very slow ballad on a different chordal structure altogether, which then became 'Darker with the Day' [from the 2001 studio album No More Shall We Part]. It had a different melody, but very slow and it made for a haunting thing. That song was composed over a long period of time and something that I would sing to my little son, Luke. It was kind of a nasty fucked-up lullaby."

Cave later claimed the album's songs were heavily influenced by street beggars he saw in Brazil, where he lived for several years while married to journalist Viviane Carneiro. "They'd get their acoustic guitars with one or two strings and bang away and make a racket that had no sense whatsoever. It was very violent and seemed to come straight out of the heart. Very unmusical."

== Release ==
Henry's Dream was released on 29 April 1992 in the United Kingdom and on 12 May in the United States. The album was released on CD, 12" vinyl and cassette. Although released on Mute Records, international distribution was handled by a number of associated labels. Indisc issued the album in Belgium, Liberation Records in Australia, Alfa Records in Japan, Virgin Records in France and Greece, and Elektra Records in the United States. Australian pressings were available in a box set including with a three-track promo cassette and initial French pressings came with a promo CD including "Papa Won't Leave You, Henry," "Straight to You," "Brother, My Cup Is Empty" and "Loom of the Land." Limited editions of other pressings came with an enclosed poster and T-shirt. A second pressing of the album was issued on 13 February 1996 throughout Europe and the United States. On 29 March 2010, Henry's Dream was reissued as a collector's edition CD/DVD set, including the remastered album, a 5.1 surround sound mix, bonus tracks, a short film about the album, the single's music videos, and exclusive liner notes.

The album's two singles—"Straight to You" and "I Had a Dream, Joe"—were released on 30 March and 31 August, respectively. The singles were a moderate commercial success. Both singles charted in Australia, at number 96 and 75, respectively, and "Straight to You" charted at number 68 in the UK Singles Chart and at number 7 in the Indie Chart in April 1992. "I Had a Dream, Joe" also reached number 10 in the Indie Chart upon its release.

=== Tour ===
Nick Cave and the Bad Seeds promoted the album with an initial tour across Europe, North America, Japan and Australia in 1992. The tour consisted of five legs and fifty-five concerts, and began in Norwich, England on 26 April 1992 and concluded in Brisbane, Australia on 12 December. In 1993, the band continued touring, adding a further two legs and twenty-three concerts in Australia, Europe and Israel, beginning on 24 January 1993 in Melbourne and concluding on 10 June in Düsseldorf, Germany. During the tour, the band performed at several music festivals, including Pukkelpop, the Reading Festival, Livid, Big Day Out and Via-Rock.

Selected recordings from the tour were featured on the band's first live album, Live Seeds (1993). Video recordings from the band's two shows in the Paradiso in Amsterdam on 2 and 3 June 1992 are featured on the live DVD Live at The Paradiso, released alongside the band's tour documentary The Road to God Knows Where (1990) in 2006.

== Critical reception ==
Professional ratings
Review scores
Source	Rating
AllMusic	3.5/5 stars
Entertainment Weekly	B+
Los Angeles Times	3.5/4 stars
Mojo	4/5 stars
NME	8/10
Q	3/5 stars
Rolling Stone	4/5 stars
The Rolling Stone Album Guide	4/5 stars
Select	4/5
The Village Voice	C

Upon its release, Henry's Dream received critical acclaim. David Browne of Entertainment Weekly said that Henry's Dream "sets Cave's deep, dolorous voice and scab-picking lyrics to windswept, tote-that-barge arrangements" and "may finally demonstrate what the fuss is all about". Holly George-Warren of Rolling Stone praised the album as "provocative – albeit harrowing – music". However, The Village Voice critic Robert Christgau, in a negative assessment, wrote that "if this is your idea of great writing, you may be ripe for his cult. Otherwise, forget it—the voice alone definitely won't do the trick." In a retrospective review, AllMusic's Ned Raggett noted that the album "showed the band in fierce and fine fettle once more" and described Cave's lyrics as "a series of striking, compelling lyrics again exploring love, lust and death", adding that the songs "showcase the Seeds' peerless abilities at fusing older styles with noisy aggression and tension" and citing "Loom of the Land" as "one of Cave's best songs ever".

The remastered edition of Henry's Dream was also well received. BBC Music reviewer Mike Diver referred to the album, and the remaster of Tender Prey (1988), as "anything but poor albums" and said that even without former member Roland Wolf "the instrumentation loses little of its potency, and religious imagery remains prominent in Cave's wordplay." Alexander Tudor of Drowned in Sound called the album "a masterclass in narrative songwriting" and referred to its songs as "favela-punk", adding that "the album's atmospheric centrepiece conveys the mystery of faith (and the weirdness of folk traditions), rather than just rattling out a pretty tune."

Henry's Dream was included in a number of album-of-the-year lists, particularly in the United Kingdom. Melody Maker listed it as number 7 on their End of Year Critics List in 1992, NME ranked it at number 5 on its end of year list, and Vox listed it as number 14 in its Albums of 1992.

== Track listing ==
All tracks are written by Nick Cave.

No.	Title	Length
1.	"Papa Won't Leave You, Henry"	5:54
2.	"I Had a Dream, Joe"	3:43
3.	"Straight to You"	4:35
4.	"Brother, My Cup Is Empty"	3:02
5.	"Christina the Astonishing"	4:51
6.	"When I First Came to Town"	5:22
7.	"John Finn's Wife"	5:13
8.	"Loom of the Land"	5:08
9.	"Jack the Ripper"	3:45
Total length:		41:33

== Personnel ==
Nick Cave and the Bad Seeds

- Nick Cave – vocals, piano (8), organ (5, 8), harmonica (6)
- Mick Harvey – rhythm guitar, piano (3), organ (2, 3, 4, 7), vibraphone (5), drums (3), percussion (5), backing vocals
- Blixa Bargeld – guitar, backing vocals
- Martyn P. Casey – bass, backing vocals
- Conway Savage – piano, vocals (6), Rhodes piano (8), backing vocals
- Thomas Wydler – drums, congas (5), backing vocals

Guest musicians

- Dennis Karmazyn – cello
- Bruce Dukov – violin
- Barbara Porter – violin

Technical personnel

- David Briggs – producer, mixing (4, 5)
- Chuck Johnson – engineer
- Nick Cave – additional producer, mixing
- Mick Harvey – additional producer, mixing
- Tony Cohen – engineer, mixing (1–3, 6–9)

Art personnel

- Anton Corbijn – art direction, photography
- Amy Hanson – sleeve notes, design

== Chart positions ==
Chart (1992)	Peak position
Australian ARIA Charts	41
Austrian Top 40	40
Dutch Top 100	70
European Albums (Eurotipsheet)	71
German Albums Chart	59
Irish Albums (IFPI)	10
Swedish Albums Chart	49
New Zealand Albums Chart	47
UK Albums Chart	29

Chart (2025)	Peak position
Croatian International Albums (HDU)	9

=== Singles ===
Year	Single	Peak positions	
Year	Single	AUS	UK
1992	"Straight to You"	96	68
1992	"I Had a Dream, Joe"	75	—

— denotes a single was released but did not chart.

== See also ==
- Live Seeds (1993)
