= Let Love In (Nick Cave and the Bad Seeds album) =

Studio album by Nick Cave and the Bad Seeds
- Released: 18 April 1994
- Recorded: September–December 1993
- Genre: Post-punk; gothic rock
- Length: 48:18
- Label: Mute
- Producer: Tony Cohen; The Bad Seeds

Nick Cave and the Bad Seeds chronology
Live Seeds (1993)	Let Love In (1994)	Murder Ballads (1996)

Singles from Let Love In
- 1. "Do You Love Me?" Released: 28 March 1994; 2. "Loverman" Released: 4 July 1994; 3. "Red Right Hand" Released: 24 October 1994

Let Love In is the eighth studio album by the Australian rock band Nick Cave and the Bad Seeds, released on 18 April 1994 by Mute Records.

As of May 2015 it was certified silver by British Phonographic Industry (BPI) for 60,000 sold units in UK. As of January 1996 the album has sold 50,000 copies in United States.

Professional ratings
Review scores
Source	Rating
AllMusic	5/5 stars
Drowned in Sound	10/10
Entertainment Weekly	B
Los Angeles Times	3.5/4 stars
NME	9/10
Pitchfork	8.5/10
Q	4/5 stars
Rolling Stone	4/5 stars
The Rolling Stone Album Guide	4/5 stars
Select	4/5

"Red Right Hand"
"Red Right Hand" audio sample

== Track listing ==
All tracks are written by Nick Cave, except where noted.

No.	Title	Music	Words	Length
1.	"Do You Love Me?"	Nick Cave; Martyn P. Casey	Cave	5:56
2.	"Nobody's Baby Now"			3:52
3.	"Loverman"			6:21
4.	"Jangling Jack"			2:47
5.	"Red Right Hand"	Cave; Mick Harvey; Thomas Wydler	Cave	6:10
6.	"I Let Love In"			4:14
7.	"Thirsty Dog"			3:48
8.	"Ain't Gonna Rain Anymore"			3:46
9.	"Lay Me Low"			5:08
10.	"Do You Love Me? (Part 2)"			6:12
Total length:				48:18

== Singles ==
- "Do You Love Me?" (MUTE 160) (28 March 1994)
  - b/w: "Cassiel's Song"/"Sail Away"
- "Loverman" (MUTE 169) (4 July 1994)
  - b/w: "B-Side"/"(I'll Love You) Till the End of the World"
- "Red Right Hand" (MUTE 172) (24 October 1994)
  - b/w: "That's What Jazz Is to Me"/"Where the Action Is"

== Personnel ==
Nick Cave and the Bad Seeds

- Nick Cave – vocals (1–10); organ (1, 3, 5, 7–9); backing vocals (1, 4, 7, 9), piano (1, 8); electric piano (10); oscillator (5); bells (3)
- Blixa Bargeld – guitar (1–10); backing vocals (1, 3, 4, 7–10); vocals (4)
- Martyn P. Casey – bass guitar (1–10); backing vocals (1, 4, 7, 9)
- Mick Harvey – guitar (1–9); backing vocals (1, 3, 4, 7, 9, 10); organ (2, 4, 6), drums (4, 9); string arrangement (8, 10); bells (5); tambourine (6); shaker (5)
- Conway Savage – backing vocals (1, 4, 6–9); piano (2–4, 6, 8)
- Thomas Wydler – drums (1–3, 5–10); tambourine (4, 8); timpani (5); shaker (3); triangle (3); temple block [fish] (5); backing vocals (1, 4, 7, 9)

Guest musicians

- Tex Perkins – backing vocals on "Do You Love Me?"
- Rowland S. Howard – backing vocals on "Do You Love Me?"
- Mick Geyer – backing vocals on "Jangling Jack"
- Nick Seferi – backing vocals on "Jangling Jack"
- Spencer P. Jones – backing vocals on "Ain't Gonna Rain Anymore"
- Robin Casinader – violin on "Ain't Gonna Rain Anymore" and "Do You Love Me? (Part 2)"
- Warren Ellis – violin on "Ain't Gonna Rain Anymore" and "Do You Love Me? (Part 2)"
- David McComb – backing vocals on "Lay Me Low"
- Donna McEvitt – backing vocals on "Do You Love Me? (Part 2)"
- Katharine Blake – backing vocals on "Do You Love Me? (Part 2)"

== Cover versions ==
"Do You Love Me" was covered by the satirical musical project New Waver as "Do You Hate Me" in 1996. The song "Loverman" was covered by the heavy metal band Metallica on Garage Inc. (1998) and Depeche Mode's Martin Gore on his debut solo studio album Counterfeit² (2003). The song "Red Right Hand" was covered by Arctic Monkeys as a B-side to their single "Crying Lightning" and as a bonus track on the Japanese version of their third studio album Humbug (2009); it was also covered by Giant Sand on their studio album Cover Magazine (2002). "Red Right Hand" was covered by PJ Harvey for the British television series, Peaky Blinders.

== Charts ==
Chart (1994)	Peak position
Australian Albums (ARIA)	8
Austrian Albums (Ö3 Austria)	14
Dutch Albums (Album Top 100)	57
European Albums (Eurotipsheet)	27
German Albums Chart	34
Hungarian Albums (MAHASZ)	35
New Zealand Albums (RMNZ)	35
Norwegian Albums (VG-lista)	18
Swedish Albums (Sverigetopplistan)	10
Swiss Albums (Schweizer Hitparade)	43
UK Albums Chart	12

Chart (2025)	Peak position
Croatian International Albums (HDU)	8

== Certifications ==
Region	Certification	Certified units/sales
Australia (ARIA)	Gold	35,000^{^}
United Kingdom (BPI)	Silver	60,000^{*}
^{*} Sales figures based on certification alone.^{^} Shipments figures based on certification alone.
