= Rudolph Moser =

German musician

Rudolph Moser (Rudi Moser) is the drummer for Einstürzende Neubauten as well as the last incarnation of Die Haut, which also included Einstürzende Neubauten guitarist Jochen Arbeit.

He also collaborated with Robert Rutman's Steel Cello Ensemble on the album Zuuhh!! Muttie Mum!.

Moser is also part of MoserMeyerDöring, an experimental band from Berlin who had a single called "Watching The Daybreak".
