= Christoph Dreher =

German filmmaker, musician and scriptwriter

Christoph Dreher (born 1952) is a German filmmaker, musician and scriptwriter. From 2000 until 2020, he was a professor of audiovisual media.

After studying political science and philosophy at the Free University of Berlin, he studied filmmaking at DFFB (Deutsche Film- und Fernsehakademie in Berlin) between 1978 and 1983.

In 1980, Dreher founded the post-punk – post-rock band Die Haut (the first line-up consisted of, in addition to Dreher, Martin Peter, Thomas Wydler and Remo Park). The name of the band was inspired by the book of the same title by German–Italian author Curzio Malaparte. With Dreher as the only permanent member, the band had changing line-ups (one of the longest lasting having consisted of Dreher, Thomas Wydler, Rainer Lingk and Jochen Arbeit) until its breakup in 2000. Originally an instrumental group with the classical instrumentation of guitars, bass and drums, for their numerous records as well as for live gigs Die Haut frequently collaborated with likeminded international singers such as Lydia Lunch, Nick Cave, Jeffrey Lee Pierce or Debbie Harry.

As filmmaker–director, Dreher has been creating audiovisual works since 1979. While still a student, he made several music videos, either for Die Haut ("Der Karibische Western") or for Nick Cave & The Bad Seeds ("Tupelo", "The Singer" and "Mercy Seat"). With Heiner Mühlenbrock, he made the feature-length film OK OK – Der Moderne Tanz.

In numerous documentary films and series, Dreher dealt with issues from the area of popular culture. For example, in the 18-part series Lost in Music, in cooperation with, amongst others, Rolf S. Wolkenstein, Ellen El Malki and Rotraut Pape, Dreher covered contemporary musical genres and their associated cultures and (life-) styles. The innovative style of his films received recognition with the Adolf Grimme Award (in 1994, for Lost in Music) and other awards.

From 2000, Dreher taught audiovisual media at Merz Akademie for Design, Art and Media in Stuttgart.

== Selected works ==
=== Publications ===
- 2010 (Editor) Auteur Series: The Re-invention of Television. Stuttgart: Merz & Solitude.

www.merz-akademie.de/remediate, mfg.merz-akademie.de/remediate

- 2013 (co-author, with Christine Lang) Breaking Down Breaking Bad – Dramaturgie und Ästhetik einer Fernsehserie Reihe Merz Akademie im Fink Verlag.

www.merz-akademie.de/projects/breaking-down-breaking-bad

- 2014 (Editor) Auteur Series II: Quality TV in the USA and Europe. Reihe Merz Akademie im Fink Verlag

=== Film and video ===
- 1980 Ok Ok – Der Moderne Tanz (co-writer/co-director, with Heiner Mühlenbrock, 90 min.)
- 1981 Commercial – 40 One-Minute-Adventures in the World of TV (writer/director, with Gusztav Hamos, 41min.)
- 1985 Die Legionäre (co-writer/co-director, with Ellen El Malki, ZDF, 30 min.)
- 1992 Die Haut live: Sweat (co-writer, co-director, with Rotraut Pape and Rolf S. Wolkenstein, 60 min.)
- 1993–98 Lost in Music (writer/director, ZDF/3sat/Arte, 18 episodes between 42 and 60 min.)
- 1993 Tekkno Trance (co-writer, co-director, 42 min., added 10 min. in 1995)
- 1994 Metal Mania (co-writer / co-director, with Rolf S. Wolkenstein, 42 min.)
- 1995 Reggae Revolution (writer/director, 60 min.)
- 1995 Hoch über Hamburg (writer/director, 52 min.)
- 1995 Hip Hop Hooray (writer/director, 42 min.)
- 1996 Deep into Dub (writer/director, 60 min.)
- 1996 Electronic Jam (writer/director, 60 min.)
- 1996 Chicago Connections (writer/director, 60 min.)
- 1995–98 Freestyle Series (studio production, co-concept, co-director, co-producer, VIVA TV, 105 episodes of 60 min.)
- 1995 Streetfashion (writer/director, ARTE, 190 min.)
- 1997 Pop Odyssee – The Beach Boys and Satan (writer/director 3sat/ZDF, 60 min)
- 1997 Digital Spirit (writer/director, ARTE, 190 min.)
- 1998 Pop Odyssee – House of the Rising Punk (writer–director, 3sat/ZDF, 60 min.)
- 2000 Silver Rockets/Kool Things – 20 Years of Sonic Youth (writer/director, ARTE, 60 min.)
- 2000 Fantastic Voyages (writer/director, 3sat/ZDF, 7 episodes of 60 min.)
  - "Introducing: The Cosmology of the Music Video"
  - "Nightmares"
  - "Body Rock"
  - "Short Stories"
  - "Liberated Images"
  - "Wonderful Worlds"
  - "Space is the place"
- 2001 Beck – Permanent Mutations (writer/director, 60 min.)
- 2002 Superhuman (writer/director, 58 min.)
- 2003 Dance the Voodoo – The Cosmos of Koffi Kôkô (writer/director (with Rotraut Pape), 45 min.)
- 2004 Voodoo Transformations (co-writer/co-director, with Rotraut Pape), ZDF/Theaterkanal, 27 min.)
- 2005 Youthquake '65 – The London Pop Explosion (writer/director, 60 min.)
- 2007 Psychedelic Revolution '67 (writer/director, 77 min.)
- 2009 No Wave – Underground '80 Berlin-New York (writer/director (with Ellen El Malki), 52 min.)
- 2012 It's more than TV – The new US-series and their makers (writer/director, 58 min.)

=== Music clips and performances ===
- 1982 Die Haut: Der Karibische Western (writer/director)
- 1983 Nick Cave & The Bad Seeds: Tupelo (writer/director)
- 1984 Nick Cave & The Bad Seeds: The Singer (writer/director)
- 1985 Nick Cave & The Bad Seeds: Mercy Seat (writer/director)
- 1994 Gentleman: When The Sunshine Go Down (writer/director)
- 1995 Advanced Chemistry: Fremd Im Eigenen Land (co-writer/co-director)
- 1996 Blumfeld: Verstärker (writer/director)
- 1996 Jever Mountain Boys: Alone and Forsaken (writer/director)

=== Multimedia and radio projects ===
- 1980–1995 Participation in numerous artistic interactive TV- and radio projects by UNIVERSCITY TV and VAN GOGH TV (Ars Electronica (Linz), Documenta (Kassel), European Media Art Festival (Osnabrück), etc., aired by 3Sat, local TV and radio stations, pirate radio, etc.

=== Recordings ===
- 1982 Burnin' the Ice (with Nick Cave)
- 1987 Headless Body in Topless Bar (with among others Nick Cave, Anita Lane and Kid Congo Powers)
- 1990 Die Hard (with Arto Lindsay)
- 1992 Head On (with among others Debbie Harry, Jeffrey Lee Pierce, Alan Vega, Lydia Lunch)
- 1993–94 Sweat (live album, with among others Nick Cave, Alexander Hacke, Blixa Bargeld)
- 1998 Spring
- 1999 Springer (Spring remixes by among others Atom Heart, Oval, Jim O´Rourke, Scanner, Mad Professor)
- 2004 Re-Issue of Burnin' the Ice (with Nick Cave) (remastered)
