= Die Haut =

German rock band

- Origin: Germany
- Genres: Post-punk; post-rock
- Years active: 1982–1997
- Past members: Christoph Dreher; Remo Park; Martin Peter; Thomas Wydler; Rainer Berson; Jochen Arbeit; Oliver Schütz; Rainer Lingk; Rudolph Moser

Die Haut (German, 'the skin') was a German rock band active in Berlin from 1982 until 1997. Formed as an instrumental rock quartet, many of their recordings and live performances featured an array of international guest vocalists. The only constant member was Christoph Dreher.

In 1983, they released Burnin' the Ice, recorded in collaboration with Nick Cave. Their last full-length album was Spring (1997) followed by a remix album called Springer (1998). At the same time the band went on hiatus, Remo Park and Christoph Dreher have continued to work as separate acts, and Jochen Arbeit with Rudolph Moser joined the Berlin-based underground legend Einstürzende Neubauten.

== Membership ==
- 1982: Christoph Dreher, Remo Park, Martin Peter, Thomas Wydler, Rainer Berson; Berson left later that year.
- 1984: Christoph Dreher, Remo Park, Jochen Arbeit, Thomas Wydler, Oliver Schütz; Rainer Lingk joined later that year.
- 1985: Christoph Dreher, Rainer Lingk, Jochen Arbeit, Thomas Wydler.
- 1997: Christoph Dreher, Rainer Lingk, Jochen Arbeit, Rudolph Moser.

Guest vocalists live and on recordings include: Nick Cave, Kid Congo Powers, Anita Lane, Debbie Harry, Paul Outlaw, Mick Harvey, Jeffrey Lee Pierce, Blixa Bargeld, Lydia Lunch, Alexander Hacke, Arto Lindsay, Kim Gordon, Cristina Martinez, Laurie Tomin, Alan Vega, Louisa Bradshaw, Danielle de Picciotto, Gordon W.

== Discography ==
- Schnelles Leben mini-LP (Monogram 008, 1982)
- "Der Karibische Western" 12" (Zensor CM2, 1982), CD (WSFA SF99, 1990)
- Burnin' the Ice LP (Illuminated SJAMS30, 1983; Crown Records CROWN1708; Paradoxx PA5502) — vocals: Nick Cave
- "Fandango" 12" (Megadisc MD125283, 1987)
- Headless Body in Topless Bar LP (WSFA SF83, 1988)
- Die Hard LP (WSFA SF91/EFA LP02691, 1989)
- "Are You Hectic?" 12" by Alert (Die Haut and Blixa Bargeld) (Cash Beat CB17/EFA MCD02817, 1992)
- Head On LP (WSFA SF122/Triple X 51148, 1992)
- Sweat LP (WSFA SF140/Triple X 51184–2, 1993) — live at Berlin Metropol, August 24, 1992, and Apeldoorn August 1992
- Sweat video (WSFA 140V/Triple X 51184–3, 1993) — live video from Tempodrom, Berlin, August 1992, 66 minutes; directed by Rolf S. Wolkenstein
- Spring LP/CD (Our Choice/Rough Trade RTD195.1914.2, 1997) — Thomas Wydler plays only on "At First ... But Then"
- Springer LP (Our Choice/Rough Trade RTD195.3363.2, 1998) — remixes of Spring
- "Cinema Excessiva" (Hans Nieswandt remix) (Rough Trade, 1998)

=== Compilation appearances ===
- "My Gift To You" on Sleep? cassette (Heiliger Strohsack Kartell, 1984)
- "Nevada" on Berlin Now video, 1985
