= The Ship Song =

- 7" single cover

Single by Nick Cave and the Bad Seeds

from the album The Good Son
- A-side: "The Ship Song"
- B-side: "The Train Song"
- Released: 12 March 1990
- Recorded: 8 October – 28 October 1989
- Studio: Cardan Studios (São Paulo)
- Genre: Alternative rock
- Length: 5:14
- Label: Mute
- Songwriter: Nick Cave
- Producer: The Bad Seeds

Nick Cave and the Bad Seeds singles chronology
"Deanna" (1988)	"The Ship Song" (1990)	"The Weeping Song" (1990)

Music video
- "The Ship Song" on YouTube

"The Ship Song" is a song written by Nick Cave (lyrics and music), originally performed by the Australian rock band Nick Cave and the Bad Seeds on their sixth studio album The Good Son (1990). It was released by Mute Records as the first single from the album on 12 March 1990, as a CD single, 7" vinyl and a 12" vinyl release. The song reached #84 on the UK Singles Charts.

The music video for the song was directed by John Hillcoat.

In May 2001 "The Ship Song" was selected by Australasian Performing Right Association (APRA) as one of the Top 30 Australian songs of all time.

== Critical reception ==
"The Ship Song" is widely regarded as one of Cave's best songs. In 2020, Far Out ranked the song number seven on their list of the 20 greatest Nick Cave songs, and in 2023, Mojo ranked the song number five on their list of the 30 greatest Nick Cave songs.

== Cover versions ==
The Sydney Opera House, with agency the Monkeys, achieved the collaboration of Neil Finn, Kev Carmody, Sarah Blasko, John Bell, Martha Wainwright, Katie Noonan, Paul Kelly, Teddy Tahu Rhodes, the Temper Trap, Angus & Julia Stone, Concrete Blonde, and Daniel Johns, with Opera Australia, the Australian Ballet, Bangarra Dance Theatre, the Sydney Symphony Orchestra, and the Australian Chamber Orchestra, to perform and record a reinterpretation of "The Ship Song" over some months in 2010–2011. Titled "The Ship Song Project", the recording was to promote the Sydney Opera House.

== Track listing ==
The track listing for the single is:

1. "The Ship Song" (Nick Cave) - 5:14
2. "The Train Song" (Nick Cave) - 3:27

== Personnel ==
Nick Cave and the Bad Seeds

- Nick Cave — vocals, piano, hammond organ
- Blixa Bargeld — guitar, backing vocals
- Kid Congo Powers — guitar
- Mick Harvey — bass, guitar, vibraphone, backing vocals
- Thomas Wydler — drums

Technical

- Bill McGee — string arrangement
- Designlayout — artwork
- Polly Borland — photography
- Victor Van Vugt — engineer
- The Bad seeds — producer

== Charts ==
Chart performance for "The Ship Song"
Chart (1990)	Peak position
Australia (ARIA)	138
UK Singles (OCC)	84

== Releases ==
Format	Country	Label	Catalogue No.	Year
CD single	UK	Mute	CD MUTE 108	12 March 1990
7" single	UK	Mute	MUTE 108	12 March 1990
12" single	UK	Mute	12 MUTE 108	12 March 1990
12" single (promotional)	UK	Mute	P12 MUTE 108	12 March 1990
CD single	Germany	Mute International	INT 826.930	March 1990

== See also ==
- Nick Cave and the Bad Seeds discography
