= The Boatman's Call =

Studio album by Nick Cave and the Bad Seeds
- Released: 3 March 1997
- Recorded: June–August 1996
- Studio: Sarm West (London)
- Length: 52:07
- Labels: Mute; Reprise
- Producers: Flood; Nick Cave and the Bad Seeds

Nick Cave and the Bad Seeds chronology
Murder Ballads (1996)	The Boatman's Call (1997)	The Best of Nick Cave & The Bad Seeds (1998)

Singles from The Boatman's Call
- 1. "Into My Arms" Released: 27 January 1997; 2. "(Are You) The One That I've Been Waiting For?" Released: 19 May 1997

The Boatman's Call is the tenth studio album by the Australian rock band Nick Cave and the Bad Seeds, released on 3 March 1997 by Mute Records. The album is entirely piano-based, alternately sombre and romantic in mood, making it a marked departure from the bulk of the band's post-punk catalogue up to that point. The Boatman's Call remains one of the most critically acclaimed releases of Nick Cave's career.

== Background and production ==
Recording for the album began at Sarm West Studios in London, England in mid-1996, with "The Garden Duet", one of the album's outtakes, being the first song recorded. Though the bulk of The Boatman's Call was recorded at Sarm West, further recordings—including overdubs—were later done at Abbey Road Studios.

Musically, the album's tone is considered sombre and minimalist and marks a major departure for Cave and the Bad Seeds. Moving away from full-band arrangements and character-based narratives, the album's music and lyrics move towards the more intimate sound of Cave's solo voice accompanied by piano or a few other instruments. The tempo is also generally slow, reflecting many of the moods of the songs.

Many of the lyrics seem to reflect on Cave's personal relationships and spiritual yearnings at the time of writing. Some songs are thought to be directed at either the mother of Cave's oldest son Luke, Viviane Carneiro (in "Where Do We Go Now But Nowhere?") or singer PJ Harvey, with whom he had a brief relationship around that time (as referenced in "West Country Girl", "Black Hair" and "Green Eyes"). "Green Eyes" includes a line from "Sonnet 18" by the French Renaissance poet Louise Labé (Kiss me, rekiss me, & kiss me again).

Cave performed "Into My Arms" at the 1997 funeral of INXS vocalist Michael Hutchence, an old friend from Cave's youth, and requested that the TV cameras be shut off for his performance out of respect for Hutchence. The song "People Ain't No Good" was also featured in the film Shrek 2 (2004). The song "There Is a Kingdom" was featured in the film Zack Snyder's Justice League (2021). In October 2010, the album was listed in the top 30 in the book, 100 Best Australian Albums (2010).

== Critical reception ==
Professional ratings
Review scores
Source	Rating
AllMusic	4.5/5 stars
Entertainment Weekly	B+
The Guardian	5/5 stars
Los Angeles Times	4/4 stars
NME	8/10
Pitchfork	6.6/10 (1997); 9.3/10 (2011)
Q	4/5 stars
Rolling Stone	4/5 stars
Select	4/5
Uncut	5/5 stars

The Boatman's Call received almost unanimous critical acclaim upon release with many reviewers citing it as Cave's most poignant album. Writing in NME, James Oldham concluded that the album is "a stark look at all that he's been through, recounted with withering bleakness and arid humour", noting "Cave's magnificent lyrics, riddled with comic misanthropy and New Gospel humanity", and "their starkly beautiful accompaniments". The magazine rated it as the 23rd best album of 1997. The album was also included in the book 1001 Albums You Must Hear Before You Die (2010).

== Track listing ==
All tracks are written by Nick Cave.

No.	Title	Length
1.	"Into My Arms"	4:15
2.	"Lime Tree Arbour"	2:56
3.	"People Ain't No Good"	5:42
4.	"Brompton Oratory"	4:06
5.	"There Is a Kingdom"	4:52
6.	"(Are You) The One That I've Been Waiting For?"	4:05
7.	"Where Do We Go Now But Nowhere?"	5:46
8.	"West Country Girl"	2:45
9.	"Black Hair"	4:14
10.	"Idiot Prayer"	4:21
11.	"Far from Me"	5:33
12.	"Green Eyes"	3:32
Total length:		52:07

2011 reissue bonus tracks
No.	Title	Music	Words	Length
13.	"Little Empty Boat"	Nick Cave; Blixa Bargeld; Martyn Casey; Mick Harvey	Cave
14.	"Right Now I'm A-Roaming"	Cave; Casey; Harvey; Conway Savage; Thomas Wydler	Cave
15.	"Black Hair" (Band version)
16.	"Come Into My Sleep"
17.	"Babe, I Got You Bad"

=== Outtakes and other songs ===
A number of other songs were recorded at The Boatman's Call sessions, some of which were later released as B-sides to the album's two singles and also on Nick Cave and the Bad Seeds 2005 compilation album, B-Sides and Rarities.

- "The Garden Duet"
- "I Do, Dear, I Do"
- "Opium Tea" (released on B-Sides & Rarities)
- "Sheep May Safely Graze" (released on B-Sides & Rarities)
- "Wake Up My Lover"
- "Farewell, Goodbye, So Long"
- "I Got Another Woman Now, Dear"
- "Little Empty Boat" (released as a B-side on "Into My Arms")
- "Right Now I'm A-Roaming" (released as a B-side on "Into My Arms")
- "Come Into My Sleep" (released as a B-side on "(Are You) The One That I've Been Waiting For?")
- "Babe, I Got You Bad" (released as a B-side on "(Are You) The One That I've Been Waiting For?"')

== Personnel ==
Nick Cave and the Bad Seeds

- Nick Cave – vocals (1–17), piano (1–3, 8, 11–13, 15), organ (2, 5, 10, 11), keyboards (casio) (4), vibes (3), keyboard (14)
- Mick Harvey – electric guitar (6, 10, 13, 14, 17), acoustic guitar (5, 7, 8, 12), bass (2), organ (6, 13, 14, 16, 17), vibes (3), bass organ (9), backing vocals (14), xylophone (16)
- Blixa Bargeld – electric guitar (4, 5, 7, 10, 11, 13, 14, 16, 17), piano treatment (8), backing vocals (13–14)
- Martyn P. Casey – bass (1, 3–8, 10, 11, 13–17), backing vocals (13)
- Conway Savage – piano (5–7, 10, 14, 16, 17), backing vocals (5)
- Warren Ellis – violin (3, 7–8, 10, 11), accordion (9), piano (9), looped violin (13)
- Jim Sclavunos – drums (6), melodica (12), bells (5, 14), percussion (13), organ (15), bongos (16), tambourine (17)
- Thomas Wydler – drums (2, 3, 5, 7, 8, 10, 11, 13–17), maracas (4), backing vocals (13)

Technical personnel

- Flood – producer, engineer, mixing
- Chris Scard – co-producer, mixing
- Paul Corkett – engineer
- Paul Hicks – assistant engineer
- Paul Wright – assistant engineer
- Nick Cave and the Bad Seeds – additional production
- Front cover photograph by Anton Corbijn
- Back cover photograph by Steve Gullick

== Charts ==
=== Weekly charts ===
Chart (1997)	Peak position
Australian Albums (ARIA)	5
Austrian Albums (Ö3 Austria)	18
Belgian Albums (Ultratop Flanders)	4
Belgian Albums (Ultratop Wallonia)	18
Dutch Albums (Album Top 100)	58
European Albums (Eurotipsheet)	9
Finnish Albums (Suomen virallinen lista)	17
French Albums (SNEP)	26
German Albums (Offizielle Top 100)	19
New Zealand Albums (RMNZ)	4
Norwegian Albums (VG-lista)	2
Scottish Albums (Official Charts)	35
Swedish Albums (Sverigetopplistan)	3
Swiss Albums (Schweizer Hitparade)	32
UK Albums (Official Charts)	22
US Billboard 200	155

=== Year-end charts ===
Chart (1997)	Position
Belgian Albums (Ultratop Flanders)	62

== Certifications ==
Region	Certification	Certified units/sales
Denmark (IFPI Danmark)	Platinum	20,000^{‡}
United Kingdom (BPI) 2011 release	Gold	100,000^{*}
United States	—	50,000
Summaries
Worldwide	—	500,000
^{*} Sales figures based on certification alone.^{‡} Sales+streaming figures based on certification alone.
