= The Weeping Song =

Single by Nick Cave and the Bad Seeds

from the album The Good Son
- B-side: "Cocks 'n' Asses"
- Released: 17 September 1990
- Recorded: October 1989
- Studio: Cardan Studios (São Paulo, Brazil)
- Genre: Gothic rock
- Length: 4:21
- Label: Mute
- Songwriter: Nick Cave
- Producer: The Bad Seeds

Nick Cave and the Bad Seeds singles chronology
"The Ship Song" (1990)	"The Weeping Song" (1990)	"Straight to You" (1992)

Music video
- "The Weeping Song" on YouTube

"The Weeping Song" is a song by the Australian rock band Nick Cave and the Bad Seeds. It was released as a single from their sixth studio album, The Good Son (1990), on 17 September 1990 by Mute Records.

The lyrics take the form of a dialogue between father and son, who alternate lines during the verses while singing together on the choruses. The father's part is sung by Blixa Bargeld, while Cave performs the son's part. Cave recalled the song "came out of nowhere with very little thought", one day while he lived in Brazil and walked from his home to a nearby bar he frequented.

== Accolades ==
Year	Publication	Country	Accolade	Rank
1990	Sounds	United Kingdom	Singles of the Year	47
2007	NME	United Kingdom	Classic Singles	*
2013	Rolling Stone	Germany	Anniversary Special: 222 Songs	*

(*) designates unordered lists.

== Formats and track listing ==
All songs written by Nick Cave, except where noted.

UK 7" single (MUTE 118)

1. "The Weeping Song" – 4:20
2. "Cocks 'n' Asses" (Nick Cave, Victor Van Vugt) – 5:45

UK CD single (CD MUTE 118)

1. "The Weeping Song" – 4:19
2. "Cocks 'n' Asses" (Nick Cave, Victor Van Vugt) – 5:46
3. "Helpless" (Neil Young) – 4:30

US CD single (9 66605-2)

1. "The Weeping Song" – 4:19
2. "The Train Song" – 4:46
3. "The B-Side Song" (Nick Cave, Victor Van Vugt) – 5:46 ("Cocks 'n' Asses" retitled for the US market)
4. "Helpless" (Neil Young) – 4:30

== Personnel ==
Adapted from The Weeping Song liner notes.

Nick Cave and the Bad Seeds

- Nick Cave – lead vocals; piano
- Blixa Bargeld – lead vocals; guitar
- Mick Harvey – bass guitar; vibraphone; shaker
- Kid Congo Powers – guitar
- Thomas Wydler – drums

Production and additional personnel

- The Bad Seeds – production
- Polly Borland – cover art; photography

== Charts ==
Chart performance for "The Weeping Song"
Chart (1990)	Peak position
Australia (ARIA)	172

== Release history ==
Region	Date	Label	Format	Catalog
United Kingdom	1990	Mute	CD; LP	MUTE 118
United States	1990	Elektra	CD	9 66605-2
