= Love Letter (Nick Cave and the Bad Seeds song) =

2002 single by Nick Cave and the Bad Seeds

Single by Nick Cave and the Bad Seeds

from the album No More Shall We Part
- B-side: "Loverman"
- Released: 26 August 2002
- Recorded: 2000
- Genre: Alternative rock
- Length: 4:08
- Label: Mute Records
- Songwriter: Nick Cave
- Producers: Nick Cave and the Bad Seeds and Tony Cohen

Nick Cave and the Bad Seeds singles chronology
"Fifteen Feet of Pure White Snow" (2001)	"Love Letter" (2002)	"Bring It On" (2003)

"Love Letter" is a song by Nick Cave and the Bad Seeds from their 2001 album, No More Shall We Part. A ballad written by Cave, it features him on vocals and piano with backing vocals by Kate & Anna McGarrigle.

"Love Letter" was first released as one of the songs on Nick Cave's 2000 spoken word album, The Secret Life of the Love Song. Since its release by Nick Cave and the Bad Seeds on their 2001 album, No More Shall We Part, Uncut magazine has placed "Love Letter" at number 14 in its list of Nick Cave's greatest songs. The song was singled out for praise by author Jonathan Lethem, who says the "shattering simplicity" of its lyrics is "worthy of Shakespeare". In AllMusic's review of No More Shall We Part, "Love Letter" is described as a "tenderly daunting, haunted house". Author Robert Mighall described it as "a staggeringly beautiful song of forlorn love and a broken heart." Musician Victor Krummenacher described "Love Letter" as "extraordinary." Music blog Ransom Note included it in its list of top 6 Nick Cave love songs, also noting the success and simplicity of the lyrics and the "aching, hopeful string arrangement".
