= Into My Arms =

Single by Nick Cave and the Bad Seeds

from the album The Boatman's Call
- B-side: "Little Empty Boat"
- Released: 27 January 1997
- Studio: Sarm West, Abbey Road (London, England)
- Genre: Alternative rock; gospel
- Length: 4:15
- Label: Mute Records
- Songwriter: Nick Cave
- Producers: Flood, Nick Cave and the Bad Seeds

Nick Cave and the Bad Seeds singles chronology
"Henry Lee" (1996)	"Into My Arms" (1997)	"(Are You) The One That I've Been Waiting For?" (1997)

"Into My Arms" is a song written by Nick Cave, and released as the first single from Nick Cave and the Bad Seeds' tenth studio album The Boatman's Call in 1997. The single, released on 27 January 1997, was pressed on 7" vinyl, as well as a standard CD single. A promotional music video for the song was also recorded.

== Background and history ==
The song takes the form of a love ballad, with a piano and an electric bass as the sole instruments used. In Cave's lecture "The Secret Life of the Love Song" to the Academy of Fine Arts Vienna, he counts the song among those he is most proud of having written.

Cave said he wrote the song in rehab: "I was actually walking back from church through the fields, and the tune came into my head, and when I got back to the facility I sat down at the cranky old piano and wrote the melody and chords, then went up to the dormitory, sat on my bed and wrote those lyrics."

Cave performed the song at the funeral of his friend, INXS singer Michael Hutchence, but requested the cameras recording the service be switched off as he performed.

== Reception ==
The song was also nominated for Single of the Year at the 1997 ARIA Awards, and came No. 18 in the Triple J Hottest 100 of that year. It was No. 84 in the 1998 Hottest 100 of All Time, and No. 36 in the 2009 Hottest 100 of All Time. In 2025, it was No. 44 in the Triple J Hottest 100 of Australian Songs. In 2020, Far Out ranked the song number three on their list of the 20 greatest Nick Cave songs, and in 2023, Mojo ranked the song number two on their list of the 30 greatest Nick Cave songs.

== Music video ==
The song's music video was directed by British director Jonathan Glazer. In an interview on the DVD The Work of Director Jonathan Glazer, Nick Cave praised the video as well-produced, but said he considered it a poor fit with the song as the video's depressing imagery overrode the melancholic optimism Cave had intended the song to convey.

== Covers ==
The song has been adapted into Greek by songwriter Dionysis Savvopoulos. The recording is included on his music album titled "To Xenodocheio" (1997).

== Track listings ==
UK CD single (Mute Records, CD MUTE 192)

1. "Into My Arms" – 4:15
2. "Little Empty Boat" – 4:25
3. "Right Now I'm A-Roaming" – 4:21

UK 7-inch single (Mute Records, MUTE 192)

1. "Into My Arms" – 4:15
2. "Little Empty Boat" – 4:25

== Charts ==
Chart (1997)	Peak position
Australian Charts	26
Finland (Suomen virallinen singlelista)	10
New Zealand Singles Chart	41
Norwegian Singles Chart	8
Swedish Singles Chart	46
UK Singles Chart	53

== Certifications ==
Region	Certification	Certified units/sales
United Kingdom (BPI)	Silver	200,000^{‡}
^{‡} Sales+streaming figures based on certification alone.
