= No More Shall We Part =

Studio album by Nick Cave and the Bad Seeds
- Released: 2 April 2001
- Recorded: September and October 2000
- Studio: Abbey Road Studios and Westside Studios, London
- Length: 67:47
- Language: English
- Label: Mute
- Producer: Nick Cave and the Bad Seeds and Tony Cohen

Nick Cave and the Bad Seeds chronology
The Best of Nick Cave and The Bad Seeds (1998)	No More Shall We Part (2001)	Nocturama (2003)

Singles from No More Shall We Part
- 1. "As I Sat Sadly by Her Side" Released: 19 March 2001; 2. "Fifteen Feet of Pure White Snow" Released: 21 May 2001; 3. "Love Letter" Released: 25 February 2002

Professional ratings
Aggregate scores
Source	Rating
Metacritic	79/100
Review scores
Source	Rating
AllMusic	4.5/5 stars
Entertainment Weekly	C−
The Guardian	4/5 stars
Los Angeles Times	3/4 stars
NME	8/10
Pitchfork	7.0/10 (2001); 8.0/10 (2011)
Q	4/5 stars
Record Collector	4/5 stars
Rolling Stone	3.5/5 stars
Uncut	4/5 stars

No More Shall We Part is the eleventh studio album by Nick Cave and the Bad Seeds, released on 2 April 2001 in the UK (and 10 April in the US). The record, which was well received critically, came after a four-year gap from recording, following the much acclaimed album The Boatman's Call and subsequent 'Best Of' album.

Nick Cave had to overcome heavy heroin and alcohol addictions in 1999–2000 before starting work on the album. It featured guest appearances by Kate & Anna McGarrigle and was met with mostly positive reviews. At Metacritic, which assigns a normalised rating out of 100 based on reviews from mainstream critics, the album has received a generally favourable score of 79, based on 18 reviews.

== Track listing ==
All tracks are written by Nick Cave, except where noted.

No.	Title	Writer(s)	Length
1.	"As I Sat Sadly by Her Side"		6:15
2.	"And No More Shall We Part"		4:00
3.	"Hallelujah"	Nick Cave, Warren Ellis	7:48
4.	"Love Letter"		4:08
5.	"Fifteen Feet of Pure White Snow"		5:36
6.	"God Is in the House"		5:44
7.	"Oh My Lord"		7:30
8.	"Sweetheart Come"	Nick Cave, Barry Adamson	4:58
9.	"The Sorrowful Wife"		5:18
10.	"We Came Along This Road"		6:08
11.	"Gates to the Garden"		4:09
12.	"Darker with the Day"	Nick Cave, Warren Ellis	6:07
Total length:			67:47

- "Darker with the Day" utilises the chordal structure and melody of the rearranged piano version of "Papa Won't Leave You, Henry" (from Henry's Dream) performed by Cave in 2000.

A limited-edition version included a bonus disc with two extra tracks, plus multi-media CD-ROM files (the 2 bonus tracks also appeared on the UK double 12" vinyl pressing of the album):

Bonus disc
No.	Title	Length
1.	"Grief Came Riding"	5:07
2.	"Bless His Ever Loving Heart"	4:02
3.	"As I Sat Sadly by Her Side" (video)
4.	"No More Shall We Part EPK" (video)

The bonus disc also includes an enhanced section featuring lyrics, photo gallery, biography, album discography, interview, and internet links.

== Singles ==
- "As I Sat Sadly by Her Side" (MUTE 249) (19 March 2001)
  1. "As I Sat Sadly by Her Side" – 6:13
  2. "Little Janey's Gone" – 3:00
  3. "Good Good Day" – 4:05
- "Fifteen Feet of Pure White Snow" (MUTE 262) (21 May 2001)
  1. "Fifteen Feet of Pure White Snow" (Single Version) – 4:07
  2. "God Is in the House" (Westside Session) – 5:52
  3. "We Came Along This Road" (Westside Session) – 5:38
- "Love Letter" (special limited edition Australia-only release, MUTE 284) (25 February 2002)
  1. "Love Letter" – 4:05
  2. "Fifteen Feet of Pure White Snow" (Westside Session) – 5:43
  3. "And No More Shall We Part" (Westside Session) – 4:09
  4. "God Is in the House" (Westside Session) – 5:52
  5. "We Came Along This Road" (Westside Session) – 5:38

== Personnel ==
Nick Cave and the Bad Seeds

- Nick Cave – vocals, piano
- Mick Harvey – guitar, string arrangement, drums on track 1
- Blixa Bargeld – guitar
- Conway Savage – organ
- Warren Ellis – violin, string arrangement
- Martyn P. Casey – bass
- Thomas Wydler – drums
- Jim Sclavunos – drums on track 4, percussion on track 5
- All male backing vocals by Nick Cave & The Bad Seeds

Guest musicians

- Kate & Anna McGarrigle – vocals
- Gavyn Wright, Patrick Kiernan, Jackie Shave, Simon Fischer, Rebecca Hirsch – violins
- Bruce White, Gustav Clarkson – violas
- Frank Schaefer, Lionel Handy, Naomi Wright – cellos
- Paul Morgan, Leon Bosch – basses

=== Production ===
- Produced by Nick Cave and the Bad Seeds and Tony Cohen
- Recorded at Abbey Road Studios, London and Westside Studios, London
- Engineered by Tony Cohen and Kevin Paul
- Assistant Engineers: Mirek Stiles (Abbey Road) and Mark Bishop (Westside)
- Mixed by Tony Cohen, Nick Cave, Blixa Bargeld and Mick Harvey at Westside Studios
- Mastered by Ray Staff at Whitfield Street, London

== Charts ==
=== Weekly charts ===
Chart (2001)	Peak position
Australian Albums (ARIA)	4
Austrian Albums (Ö3 Austria)	4
Belgian Albums (Ultratop Flanders)	4
Belgian Albums (Ultratop Wallonia)	29
Danish Albums (Hitlisten)	8
Dutch Albums (Album Top 100)	23
European Albums (Eurotipsheet)	5
Finnish Albums (Suomen virallinen lista)	10
French Albums (SNEP)	17
German Albums (Offizielle Top 100)	8
Irish Albums (IFPI)	8
Italian Albums (FIMI)	9
New Zealand Albums (RMNZ)	21
Norwegian Albums (VG-lista)	1
Scottish Albums (OCC)	16
Swedish Albums (Sverigetopplistan)	8
Swiss Albums (Schweizer Hitparade)	24
UK Albums (OCC)	15
US Billboard 200	180

== Certifications and sales ==
Region	Certification	Certified units/sales
Italy	—	30,000
Norway (IFPI Norway)	Gold	25,000^{*}
United Kingdom (BPI)	Silver	60,000^{^}
^{*} Sales figures based on certification alone.^{^} Shipments figures based on certification alone.

== Exhibitions inspired by the album ==
In 2019, Greek artist Stefanos Rokos, presented his artistic approach to the album "No More Shall We Part" by Nick Cave & The Bad Seeds, an art exhibition that started its journey in Greece and travelled to Antwerp, Belgium. The NMSWP part project is a testimony of Stefanos Rokos' personal proposal for a dialectic to be developed between two artistic forms- those of painting and songwriting, which have all along constituted the very core of artistic expression and creativity.

Nick Cave said about the paintings: "It was extraordinary to stand in the studio and see the paintings for real – the grandeur of them, with all their congested details and terrifying blank spaces. I feel connected to the essence of them. I feel they are very close to the way I write lyrics – intense bursts of memory, ecstatic detail, sudden erotics, esoteric imagery; the forging of frozen narratives that hover about like dreams, haunted and strange and life-affirming."
