= Fifteen Feet of Pure White Snow =

2001 single by Nick Cave and the Bad Seeds

Single by Nick Cave and the Bad Seeds

from the album No More Shall We Part
- B-side: "God Is in the House" (Westside Session), "And No More Shall We Part" (Westside Session)
- Released: 2001
- Genre: Alternative rock
- Length: 4:08
- Label: Mute Records
- Songwriter: Nick Cave
- Producers: Nick Cave and the Bad Seeds and Tony Cohen

Nick Cave and the Bad Seeds singles chronology
"As I Sat Sadly by Her Side" (2001)	"Fifteen Feet of Pure White Snow" (2001)	"Love Letter" (2002)

"Fifteen Feet of Pure White Snow" is a song by Nick Cave and the Bad Seeds from their 2001 album, No More Shall We Part. It is also the second single from the album.

It has a promotional video featuring the band playing live in a former building of the Central Committee of the Communist Party of Kazakhstan, with people dancing around, some of which are famous musicians such as Jarvis Cocker of Pulp, Jason Donovan, Noah Taylor and several others.

== Charts ==
Chart (2001)	Peak position
UK Singles (OCC)	52
