= Jennifer Higgie =

Australian writer

- Occupations: Novelist, screenwriter, art critic
- Writing career
- Language: English
- Years active: 2006–present

Jennifer Higgie is an Australian novelist, screenwriter, art critic and editor of the London-based contemporary arts magazine Frieze.

== Career ==
In 2017, Higgie's first children's book, There's Not One, was published by Scribe. It was shortlisted for the Australian Book Design Awards. In 2006, she published the novel Bedlam. She is also the writer of the recently completed independent feature film I Really Hate My Job (2007), directed by Oliver Parker and starring Neve Campbell, Shirley Henderson, Alexandra Maria Lara and Danny Huston.

== Bibliography ==
- Bedlam (Sternberg, 2006) ISBN 978-1-933128-12-2
- The Mirror and the Palette: Rebellion, Revolution and Resilience: 500 Years of Women's Self-Portraits. Weidenfeld, 2021) ISBN 9781474613804
- The Other Side. Pegasus Books. 2 January 2024. ISBN 978-1-63936-543-2.
