= The Good Son (album) =

Studio album by Nick Cave and the Bad Seeds
- Released: 17 April 1990
- Recorded: by Victor Van Vugt at São Paulo, October 1989, mixed by Flood, Gareth Jones at Berlin, November–December 1989
- Studios: Cardan Studios (São Paulo, Brazil)
- Genres: Dark cabaret; blues
- Length: 45:12
- Label: Mute
- Producer: The Bad Seeds

Nick Cave and the Bad Seeds chronology
Tender Prey (1988)	The Good Son (1990)	Henry's Dream (1992)

Singles from The Good Son
- 1. "The Ship Song" Released: 12 March 1990; 2. "The Weeping Song" Released: 17 September 1990

Professional ratings
Review scores
Source	Rating
AllMusic	4/5 stars
Drowned in Sound	9/10
Entertainment Weekly	B
Los Angeles Times	4/5 stars
NME	8/10
Paste	7.8/10
Q	3/5 stars
Record Mirror	4/5
The Rolling Stone Album Guide	3.5/5 stars
Uncut	4/5 stars

The Good Son is the sixth studio album by the Australian rock band Nick Cave and the Bad Seeds, released on 17 April 1990 by Mute Records.

After two dark and harrowing studio albums with Your Funeral... My Trial (1986) and Tender Prey (1988), The Good Son was a substantial departure with a lighter and generally more uplifting sound. The change of mood was greatly inspired by lead vocalist Nick Cave falling in love with Brazilian journalist Viviane Carneiro, and an apparently salutary spell in rehab which purged much of the despair and squalor reflected in the previous two studio albums. Cave later said, "I guess The Good Son is some kind of reflection of the way I felt early on in Brazil. I was quite happy there. I was in love and the first year or two was good. The problem I found was ... in order to survive you have to adopt their attitudes towards everything, which are kind of blinkered."

== Singles and release history ==
The Good Son was preceded by the release of "The Ship Song" single. A different version of "The Weeping Song" was later released as a single, with a different mix from the album version.

The closing track "Lucy" was resurrected in 1993 as a B-side of "What a Wonderful World", a collaboration of the Bad Seeds and the Pogues' Shane MacGowan.

The album was remastered and reissued on 29 March 2010 as a collector's edition CD/DVD set.

== Track listing ==
All tracks are written by Nick Cave, except where noted.

No.	Title	Music	Words	Length
1.	"Foi Na Cruz"			5:39
2.	"The Good Son"			6:01
3.	"Sorrow's Child"			4:36
4.	"The Weeping Song"			4:21
5.	"The Ship Song"			5:14
6.	"The Hammer Song"			4:16
7.	"Lament"			4:51
8.	"The Witness Song"			5:57
9.	"Lucy"	Nick Cave; Blixa Bargeld; Roland Wolf	Cave	4:17
Total length:				45:12

== Personnel ==
Nick Cave and the Bad Seeds

- Nick Cave – vocals; piano; Hammond organ; harmonica
- Mick Harvey – bass; acoustic guitar; vibraphone; percussion; backing vocals; all guitars on "The Hammer Song"
- Blixa Bargeld – guitar; backing vocals; co-lead "Father" vocals on "The Weeping Song"
- Kid Congo Powers – guitar
- Thomas Wydler – drums; percussion

with:

- Roland Wolf – piano on reprise section of "Lucy"
- Clóvis Trindade, Rubinho – vocals on "Foi Na Cruz"

String Section

- Alexandre Ramirez, Altamir Téa Bueno Salinas, Helena Akiku Imasoto, Léa Kalil Sadi – violin
- Akira Terazaki, Glauco Masahiro Imasato – viola
- Braulio Marques Lima, Cristina Manescu – cello
- Cláudia Ferreti – string and singer coordinator
- Mick Harvey and Billy McGee – string arrangements

== Charts ==
=== Weekly charts ===
Weekly chart performance for The Good Son
Chart (1990)	Peak position
Australian Albums (Kent Music Report)	93
Dutch Albums (Album Top 100)	44
Norwegian Albums (VG-lista)	19
Swedish Albums (Sverigetopplistan)	38
UK Albums (Official Charts)	47

Chart (2025)	Peak position
Croatian International Albums (HDU)	12
