= Conway Savage =

Australian musician (1960–2018)

- Savage in 1992

Background information
- Born: Conway Victor Savage; 27 July 1960; Victoria, Australia
- Died: 2 September 2018 (aged 58) Melbourne, Victoria, Australia
- Genres: Post-punk; alternative rock
- Occupations: Musician; singer-songwriter; composer
- Instruments: Piano; keyboards; organ; vocals
- Years active: 1980–2017
- Labels: Mute; Beheaded Communications

Conway Victor Savage (27 July 1960 – 2 September 2018) was an Australian rock musician. He was a member of Nick Cave and The Bad Seeds, providing piano, organ & backing vocals from 1990 to 2017.

Savage released solo albums entitled Nothing Broken (2000) & Wrong Man's Hands (2004) as well as a compilation called Rare Songs & Performances 1989–2004. He also collaborated with other artists such as Suzie Higgie for Soon Will Be Tomorrow in 1998 & "Quickie For Ducky" by Amanda Fox & Robert Tickner in 2007.

== Biography ==
Conway Victor Savage was born on 27 July 1960 and grew up in country Victoria where his parents were publicans. His brother, Frank Savage, is a part-time rock music cabaret singer and builder. His niece, Cash Savage, is the lead singer of the band Cash Savage and the Last Drinks. Savage began playing piano in his early teens in the dining room of one of the pubs his parents owned. He later recalled "I just really enjoyed it ... I could just sit down and play it and play it – it's a beautiful relaxation, until this day. But it wasn't like I was playing in the pub for nickels and dimes or anything. I was really embarrassed about it and I kept it pretty quiet".

From 1980 to 1981, Savage was on piano and backing vocals in Happy Orphans, with Jim White on drums. He was also in Scrap Museum over a similar time period. From 1982 to 1986 he was in a country music band, The Feral Dinosaurs, again with White. Other members of that group were Nick Danyi on saxophone and vocals; Dave Last on double bass and vocals; and Jim Shugg on guitar (ex-People with Chairs up Their Noses). The group issued a track, "Blue Day", on a various artists' compilation album, Asleep at the Wheel (1984). A single, "Ramblin' Man", followed before they released an extended play, You've all Got a Home to Go To, in December 1985. Also in the 1980s he played in the Melbourne-based country-rock band, Dust on the Bible, with his sister-in-law Jane (Frank's wife) as lead vocalist. In 1988, with Last, he formed Dave Last and The Legendary Boy Kings, which included Bruce Kane on drums; Manny Markogiannakos on guitar; and Shane Walsh on bass.

In 1989 Conway Savage joined Dave Graney and the White Buffaloes on keyboards and played with them for all of that year, including recording the album My Life On The Plains for Fire Records. It was recorded at Sing Sing Studios in Richmond, Melbourne and was produced by Phil Vinall from the UK. Other members of the band included Rod Hayward on guitar and Chris Walsh ex of the Moodists (as were Dave Graney and Clare Moore). Savage joined Nick Cave and The Bad Seeds in 1990 on piano, organ and backing vocals to promote their sixth album, The Good Son (April 1990). He has since appeared on their studio albums including Henry's Dream (April 1992), Let Love In (April 1994), Murder Ballads (February 1996), The Boatman's Call (March 1997), No More Shall We Part (April 2001) and Abattoir Blues / The Lyre of Orpheus (September 2004). In October 1995 Conway contributed lead vocals for "The Willow Garden", a B-side of the single, "Where the Wild Roses Grow". Due to the overall minimal piano parts on the band's fourteenth release, Dig, Lazarus, Dig!!! (March 2008), Conway was used on backing vocals and hand claps.

Through the late 1980s and into the 1990s, he also guested on albums and singles for various fellow Australian musicians, including Kim Salmon, Dave Graney (My Life on the Plain, 1989), David McComb (The Message EP, 1991), Spencer P. Jones (Rumour of Death, 1994), and Robert Forster (I Had a New York Girlfriend, 1995). Savage started to record his own solo material from late 1992, when he released a self-titled four-track EP. He provided lead vocals, piano and organ; and was assisted by fellow Bad Seeds members: Martyn P. Casey on bass guitar; and Mick Harvey on drums, guitar and backing vocals.

In late 1995, he linked up with singer-songwriter-guitarist Suzie Higgie (of Falling Joys) for the collaborative album Soon Will Be Tomorrow. It was produced by Higgie's husband Matt Crosbie. Its release was delayed until after Falling Joys disbanded and appeared in June 1998 on Anchor & Hope, distributed by Shock Records. Liz Armitage of Canberra Times described the album as an "almost country-medieval record". Australian musicologist Ian McFarlane felt it was "a low-key and low-fi album of soft-hued country 'n' blues tunes" containing "sparse folk/pop tunes and quiet love songs". The duo toured to promote the album.

Savage released his debut full-length album Nothing Broken on his own label, Beheaded Communications, in 2000. He used Casey and Harvey; together with Charlie Owen on banjo and guitars (acoustic and electric); and Tony Wyzenbeek on harmonica. It was co-produced by Savage and his engineer, Dave McCluney. The musicians were recorded without Savage's vocals, which were added later, but just a piano guide track. A reviewer at 16horsepower.com felt "This somewhat blindfolded approach to the songs, results in a fresh, impromptu feel to this stately, contemplative album. Spontaneity has always been an essential element in the recording process for Savage, and this daring approach is vindicated once more". In August 2002 it was re-released in Europe by Cargo Records.

Savage's next solo album Wrong Man's Hands, released in 2004, was recorded from late 2003 to early the next year on an 8-track in a room above the Union Club Hotel, Fitzroy, with members of Melbourne band The Stream, Amanda Fox and Robert Tickner. He admitted that he used a little James Joyce in one of his lyrics "but please don't sue me ... I probably owe you the price of a cup of coffee ... some of his words drifted into my imagination with the songs and next thing they – they just fitted like a glove and I just went with it". Savage's 2005 compilation album Rare Songs & Performances 1989–2004 traced his various studio and live material recorded in Australia and Europe. Guest musicians include Casey, Fox, Harvey, Jones, Tickner, and White.

Savage, Fox and Tickner issued a collaborative album Quickie for Duckie in 2007, which was followed by Savage's solo effort Live in Ireland the next year. It had been recorded live at the Glens Centre Manorhamilton, Leitrim on 18 October 2008. NME's Edwin McFee noted that Savage's vocals are "a bit like sand and glue. He may not be blessed with the purest set of pipes, but his quivering, piano-led renditions of songs from his last four albums frame his ragged, whiskey-soaked vocals perfectly".

In 2010, Savage, Fox and Tickner issued the six-track EP Pussy's Bow, which had been recorded in Ireland's Tumbleweed Studios in Dundalk in the previous August. Recording engineers were Derek Turner and Jason Varley; while Savage supplied lead vocals, piano and keyboards; Fox was on organ, accordion, percussion and backing vocals; and Tickner delivered guitars and backing vocals. I-94 Bar's Barman reviewed the EP "If, like me, you think of him principally as Nick Cave's piano player, then you need to take a deeper dive ... [it] blows away some of the preconceptions of him as solely a country artist or (gasp) a Goth ... [it] is nothing but a record of contrasting moods. And a very good one".

Savage underwent medical and surgical treatment for a brain tumour in Brooklyn, NY in 2017. He died, aged 58, on 2 September 2018.

Ghosteen (2019), the Bad Seeds' seventeenth album, was dedicated to Savage.

== Discography ==
Conway Savage is credited with: organ, piano, keyboards, backing vocals, guitar, hand clapping, composer, producer.

- 1993 Conway Savage (EP)
- 1998 Soon Will Be Tomorrow (by Suzie Higgie and Conway Savage)
- 2000 Nothing Broken
- 2004 Wrong Man's Hands
- 2005 Rare Songs & Performances 1989–2004 (compilation album)
- 2007 Quickie for Ducky (by Conway Savage, Amanda Fox and Robert Tickner)
- 2008 Live in Ireland (live album)
- 2010 Pussy's Bow (EP, by Conway Savage, Amanda Fox and Robert Tickner)
