= Thomas Wydler =

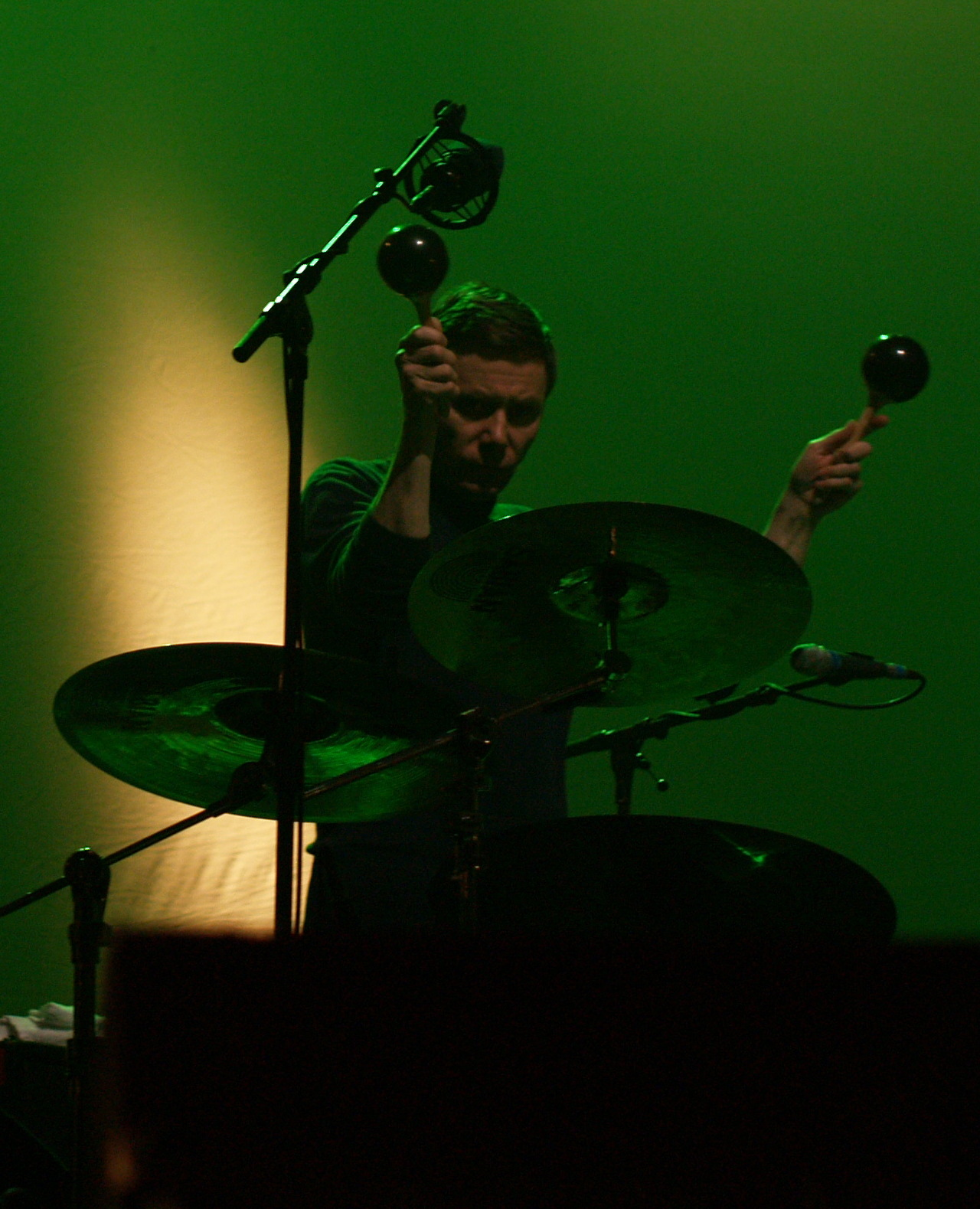
- Wydler with Nick Cave and the Bad Seeds in 2008

Background information
- Born: 9 October 1959 (age 67); Zürich, Switzerland
- Genres: Avant-garde, post-punk
- Instruments: Drums; vocals
- Years active: 1982–present
- Label: Mute Records
- Member of: Nick Cave and the Bad Seeds
- Formerly of: Die Haut

Thomas Wydler (born 9 October 1959), is a Swiss musician, best known as the drummer of Nick Cave and the Bad Seeds, which he has been a member of since 1985. Prior to joining the band, he was a founding member of the experimental German band Die Haut. Wydler has also released albums as a solo artist.

Wydler has appeared on almost every Bad Seeds album, making his debut appearance on the group's third studio album Kicking Against the Pricks (1986). After the departure of founding member Mick Harvey in January 2009, Wydler became the longest-serving member of the Bad Seeds apart from singer and frontman Nick Cave. In addition to drumming for the band, he performs backing vocals and sang lead vocals on a verse from the song "Death Is Not the End" of the Murder Ballads album.

== Career ==
Wydler was one of the founding members of the experimental German band Die Haut in 1982. The band released their debut album, Burnin' the Ice, the following year, featuring lyrical and vocal contributions from Nick Cave. Wydler joined Nick Cave and the Bad Seeds in 1985 and made his recording debut with the band on the 1986 album Kicking Against the Pricks. He was the band's sole drummer until Jim Sclavunos joined in 1994. Wydler generally plays a standard drum kit while Sclavunos handles a variety of auxiliary percussion (e.g., vibraphone, maracas, cowbell, tubular bells), but occasionally this is reversed and sometimes both members play conventional drums alongside each other as a form of double drumming.

Wydler made his debut as a solo artist on the 2004 collaboration album Morphosa Harmonia with Toby Dammit. Due to unspecified health problems, Wydler did not tour with the band from around 2013, but he remains a member of the group and has contributed to all subsequent studio albums. Founding Bad Seed Barry Adamson temporarily rejoined the group during this era as a drummer, given that many of the band's newer songs were arranged for two percussionists. Wydler rejoined the Bad Seeds on tour in 2017.

== Discography ==
=== Solo ===
- Morphosa Harmonia (2004) (with Toby Dammit)
- Tribute To Walter Stöhrer (2005) (with Martin Peter and Yoyo Röhm)
- Soul Sheriff (2007)
- On The Mat And Off (2012)

=== With Die Haut ===
Studio albums

- Burnin' the Ice (1983)
- Headless Body In Topless Bar (1988)
- Die Hard (1989)
- Head On (1992)
- Spring (1997)

=== With Nick Cave and the Bad Seeds ===
Studio albums

- Kicking Against the Pricks (1986)
- Your Funeral... My Trial (1986)
- Tender Prey (1988)
- The Good Son (1990)
- Henry's Dream (1992)
- Let Love In (1994)
- Murder Ballads (1996)
- The Boatman's Call (1997)
- No More Shall We Part (2001)
- Nocturama (2003)
- Abattoir Blues / The Lyre of Orpheus (2004)
- Dig, Lazarus, Dig!!! (2008)
- Push the Sky Away (2013)
- Skeleton Tree (2016)
- Ghosteen (2019)
- Wild God (2024)
