= Grinderman discography =

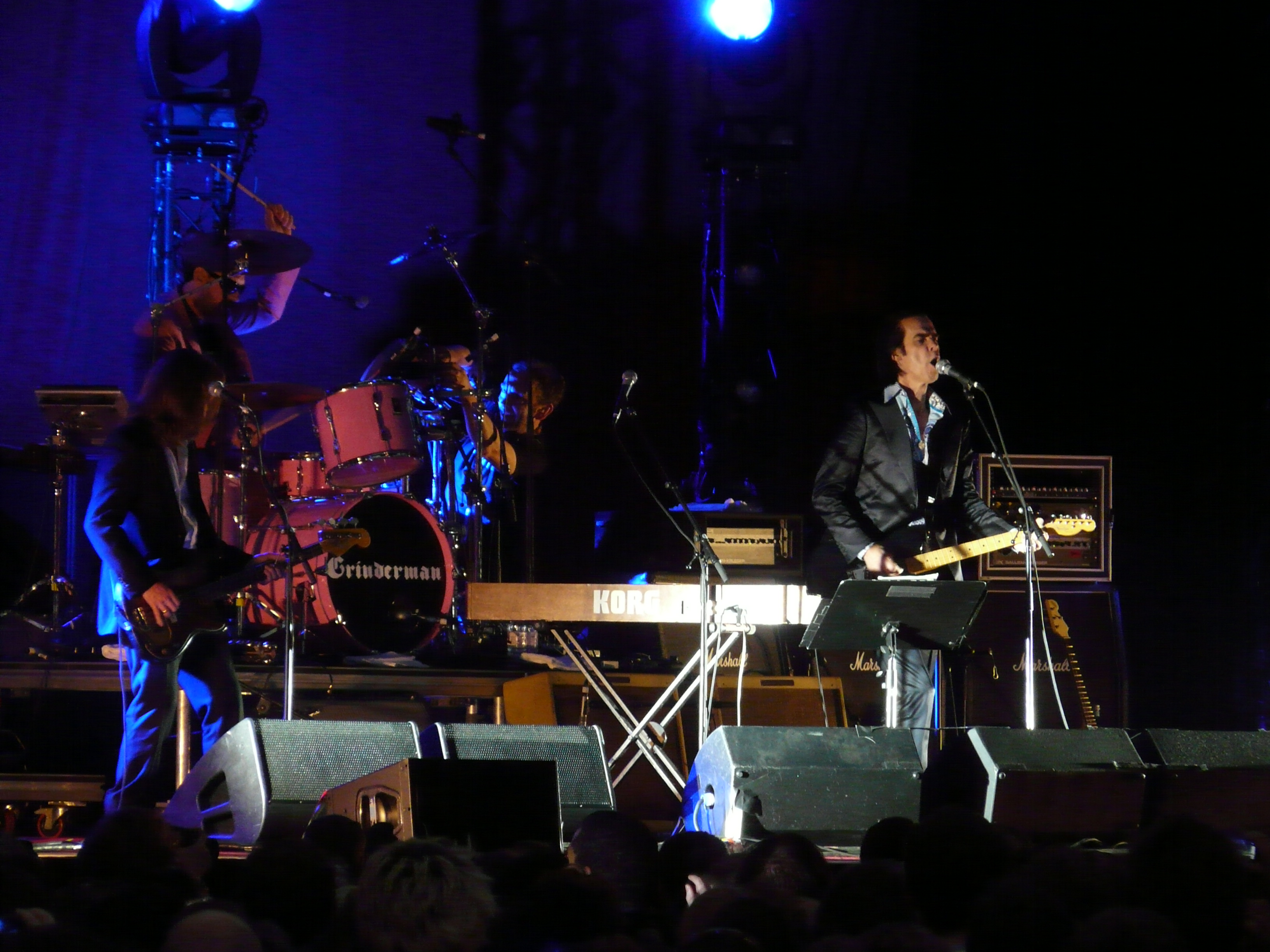
- Grinderman performing live on-stage in 2011.
- Studio albums: 2
- Singles: 8
- Music videos: 6
- Remix albums: 1
- Miscellaneous appearances: 1

The discography of Grinderman, a former London-based alternative rock group, consists of two studio albums, one remix album, eight singles, and six music videos.

Grinderman was formed by vocalist and guitarist Nick Cave, multi-instrumentalist Warren Ellis, bassist Martyn P. Casey and drummer Jim Sclavunos, as a side project to Nick Cave and the Bad Seeds, in 2006. The band released its debut eponymous album, Grinderman, in 2007 on Mute Records. The album charted in ten countries upon its release and reached number 1 on the US Billboard Heatseekers Albums. Following a short break to focus on Nick Cave and the Bad Seeds fourteenth studio album, Dig, Lazarus, Dig!!! (2008), the band released its second studio album, Grinderman 2 in 2010. A major critical success, the album resulted in five singles and extensive touring over a two-year-period. Grinderman disbanded in December 2011 following a performance at the Meredith Music Festival in Victoria, Australia to focus on The Bad Seeds upcoming material. However, Jim Sclavunos has since said: "I can't predict what the future of Grinderman is – if there is a future."

Grinderman and Grinderman 2 were moderate commercial successes, charting in a number of countries within the first week of their releases. Grinderman has been certified Gold in Greece, with sales of over 6,000 copies. Collectively, the band's two studio albums have sold 88,000 copies in the United States, according to Nielsen SoundScan.

== Albums ==
=== Studio albums ===
Year	Details	Peak positions										Sales	Certifications (sales thresholds)
Year	Details	AUS	BEL	GER	FRA	IRL	NLD	NZD	SWE	UK	US	Sales	Certifications (sales thresholds)
2007	Grinderman: Released: 7 March 2007; Labels: Mute (272), ANTI- (86861-2); Formats: CD, LP, digital download	14	6	55	102	15	35	38	18	23	150	GRE: 6,000+; US: 88,000^{[I]}	GRE: Gold
2010	Grinderman 2: Released: 13 September 2010; Labels: Mute (299), ANTI- (87110-2); Formats: CD, LP, digital download	9	1	26	38	23	16	15	24	14	38	GRE: 6,000+; US: 88,000^{[I]}	

=== Remix albums ===
Year	Details	Peak positions
Year	Details	BEL
2012	Grinderman 2 RMX: Released: 26 March 2012; Labels: Mute (299), ANTI- (87198-1); Formats: CD, LP, digital download	71

== Singles ==
=== Retail singles ===
Year	Single	Peak positions		Album
Year	Single	FRA	UK	Album
2007	"Get It On"	—	—	Grinderman
2007	"No Pussy Blues"	—чцюф	64	Grinderman
2007	"(I Don't Need You To) Set Me Free"	—	—	Grinderman
2010	"Heathen Child"	41	—	Grinderman 2
2010	"Worm Tamer"	52	—	Grinderman 2
2011	"Palaces of Montezuma"	—	—	Grinderman 2
2011	"Evil"^{[II]}	—	—	Grinderman 2
2012	"Mickey Mouse and the Goodbye Man"	—	—	Grinderman 2

=== Promotional singles ===
Year	Single	Album
2007	"When My Love Comes Down"^{[III]}	Grinderman
2008	"No Pussy Blues" remixes^{[IV]}	Non-album single.

== Other appearances ==
=== Studio ===
Year	Song	Album	Notes	Reference
2008	"Dream (Song for Finn)" and "Song for Frank"	Palermo Shooting	Original songs	

=== Guest ===
Year	Song	Artist	Album	Notes	Reference
2008	"Just Like a King"	Seasick Steve	I Started Out with Nothin and I Still Got Most of It Left	Co-written by Nick Cave and featuring Cave on vocals, Jim Sclavunous on drums and Warren Ellis on fiddle	

== Music videos ==
Year	Title	Director
2007	"No Pussy Blues"	John Hillcoat
2007	"Electric Alice"	John Hillcoat
2007	"Grinderman"	John Hillcoat
2010	"Heathen Child"	John Hillcoat
2010	"Evil"	John Hillcoat
2011	"Mickey Mouse and the Goodbye Man"	Ilinca Höpfner

== Notes ==
- I Sales figure represent sales of both Grinderman and Grinderman 2, as of December 2011.
- II Limited edition release only, released on Record Store Day 2011.
- III Promotional CDR also featuring "Depth Charge Ethel" and "Electric Alice."
- IV Promotional CDR featuring remixes by G.e.R.M., Midfield General, Adam Freeland, T.Raumschmiere and Electronic Periodic.
