= Palaces of Montezuma =

Single by Grinderman

from the album Grinderman 2
- B-side: "When My Baby Comes" (Cat's Eyes remix)
- Released: 14 March 2011
- Recorded: August 2008–2009
- Studio: RAK, London; State of the Ark, London; Assault & Battery 2, London
- Genre: Alternative rock, garage rock
- Length: 3:32
- Label: Mute
- Songwriters: Nick Cave, Warren Ellis, Martyn P. Casey, Jim Sclavunos
- Producers: Nick Launay, Grinderman

Grinderman singles chronology
"Worm Tamer" (2010)	"Palaces of Montezuma" (2011)	"Evil" (2011)

"Palaces of Montezuma" is a song by the alternative rock band Grinderman. It is the eighth track and third single from the band's second and final studio album, Grinderman 2, and was released on 14 March 2011 on Mute Records. Produced by Nick Launay and written collectively by vocalist Nick Cave, multi-instrumentalist Warren Ellis, bassist Martyn P. Casey and drummer Jim Sclavunos, the song has been described as an "atypically straightforward love song" and was written for Cave's wife, Susie Bick.

Upon its single release, "Palaces of Montezuma" received positive acclaim, though the song failed to chart.

Frankie Duffy of Scottish rock band Rising Signs claimed the song was a rip-off of the Rising Signs' 2005 song "Grey Man". Nick Cave denied the claims.

== Origin and recording ==
"Palaces of Montezuma" was recorded during the sessions for Grinderman 2. The sessions began in August 2008 at RAK Studios in London, England and continued in State of the Ark and Assault & Battery 2 until August 2009. Nick Cave has claimed that Grinderman had initially planned leaving the song off the album.

Three versions of the songs were mixed. The album mix was by producer Nick Launay. A single and radio edit version was mixed by Cenzo Townshend, which featured alterations including increasing the tempo, editing out the final refrains and adding different vocal takes. The third version was a remix by former Bad Seed Barry Adamson, stripping most of the guitar instrumentation and emphasising the piano. Adamson's remix was featured as one of the single's three b-sides and was included on the remix album, Grinderman 2 RMX (2012).

The song's title refers to the Moctezuma II, the Aztec leader and ruler of Tenochtitlan from 1502 to 1520. The song was used as an outro to an episode of the BBC Psychological Thriller series Luther.

== Composition ==
"Palaces of Montezuma" is written in the key of E major with the main guitar riff constructed from four chords (E–G♯_{5}–A_{5}–B_{5}). The song's chorus reverts to three fifth chords(A_{5}–E_{5}–B_{5}). The song uses a I–V-II chord progression. The music was composed by multi-instrumentalist Warren Ellis, bassist Martyn P. Casey and drummer Jim Sclavunos and has been described as "a meditative pop song that you can either boogie to, or kiss your baby goodnight to."

The song's lyrics were written by Nick Cave and have been described as an "atypically straightforward love song" and "a list of over-the-top romantic promises; its protagonist, having initially offered up a 'custard-coloured super dream of Ali McGraw [sic] and Steve McQueen." The lyrics make allusions to other people in popular culture, including Mata Hari, Miles Davis, John F. Kennedy and Marilyn Monroe, and historical figures including Akbar the Great and Gilgamesh. Cave has since said that the song was written for his wife, Susie Bick.

=== Plagiarism claims ===
In October 2010, Frankie Duffy, the frontman of the defunct Scottish rock band Rising Signs, accused Grinderman of plagiarism, claiming "Palaces of Montezuma" was a rip-off Rising Signs' 2005 song "Grey Man." In an interview with The Courier, Duffy said "it's exactly the same A, E and B chords, which to be fair anybody could use to write a song at any time. But it's the chord progression and when the vocal hook comes in with some ooohs, it's exactly the same, you can just hear it's the same thing." Duffy added "it could be a really huge, amazing coincidence" but considered taking legal action if Grinderman's management did not respond to his claims. Nick Cave denied the claims during a live performance at the Hammersmith Apollo in London on 1 October 2010.

== Release and reception ==
"Palaces of Montezuma" was initially released on Grinderman 2, released on 13 September 2010. On 25 January 2011, Grinderman announced that the song was due to be released as the band's third single from the album. The single was released on 14 March 2011 as a digital download. A limited edition multi-coloured 12" LP was released as part of Record Store Day 2011 on 16 April 2011.

Critical response to "Palaces of Montezuma" was positive. Artrocker magazine awarded the single a full five stars, and said the song "gives Cave his most soulful, intimate and accessible vocal since 'Into My Arms', delivered to a subtle but groovy dance beat and a tender gospel atmosphere." Pitchfork Media reviewer Sean Fennessey referred to the song as "a 'We Didn't Start the Fire' for heroin addicts, haunted by visions of Miles Davis, Marilyn Monroe, JFK, and 'a custard-colored super-dream of Ali MacGraw and Steve McQueen'" and called it "unhinged and unerringly beautiful." and Sean O'Neill of The A.V. Club said the song was "even breaking the band's own 'No love, no piano' creed" and referred to it as "grandiloquent."

== Track listing ==
Digital download and 12-inch single

1. "Palaces of Montezuma" (Cenzo mix) – 3:15
2. "Palaces of Montezuma" (Barry Adamson remix) – 4:58
3. "Palaces of Montezuma" – 3:32
4. "When My Baby Comes" (Cat's Eyes remix) – 5:27

== Personnel ==
All personnel credits adapted from Grinderman 2's liner notes.

Grinderman

- Nick Cave – vocals, electric guitar, piano
- Warren Ellis – electric guitar, backing vocals
- Martyn P. Casey – bass, acoustic guitar, backing vocals
- Jim Sclavunos – drums, percussion, backing vocals

Technical personnel

- Nick Launay – producer, engineer, mixing
- Kevin Paul – assistant producer
