= Vanity set (disambiguation) =

Vanity set may refer to:

- Vanity set, a personal grooming accessory.
- The Vanity Set, an indie rock group.
- Vanity furniture set, a matched combination of a dressing table, a chair, and a makeup mirror.
