= (I Don't Need You To) Set Me Free =

Single by Grinderman

from the album Grinderman
- Released: 30 April 2007
- Recorded: March 2006 at RAK Studios, London, United Kingdom
- Genre: Alternative rock, garage rock
- Length: 3:36
- Label: Mute Records/ANTI-
- Songwriters: Nick Cave, Grinderman
- Producers: Nick Launay, Grinderman

Grinderman singles chronology
| "No Pussy Blues" (2007) | "(I Don't Need You To) Set Me Free" (2007) | "Heathen Child" (2010) |

"(I Don't Need You To) Set Me Free" is the third single by alternative rock group Grinderman, and final single from their eponymous debut album, Grinderman. Much like their first single "Get It On", the single is a special A-side only release.

== Critical reception ==
The single did not receive as much acclaim as the band's previous two singles, with Pitchfork Media stating that:

the measured soul of "(I Don't Need You to) Set Me Free" and the familiar melodrama [...] are prime Cave, but each marks a slight deviation from the Grinderman aesthetic. They're just a little too classy, too neat, despite the roaring undercurrent of musical violence in the last, which picks up right before the song cuts off.

== Track listing ==
- UK 7-inch single (MUTE 381)
1. "(I Don't Need You To) Set Me Free" – 3:36

== Musicians and personnel ==
- Nick Cave – lead vocals, electric guitar, organ, piano, artwork
- Warren Ellis – acoustic guitar, viola, violin, electric bouzouki, electric mandolin, backing vocals
- Martyn Casey – bass, acoustic guitar, backing vocals
- Jim Sclavunos – drums, percussion, backing vocals
- Nick Launay – producer, engineer
- Grinderman - additional production
- Stuart Hawkes - mastering
