= Worm Tamer =

Single by Grinderman

from the album Grinderman 2
- Released: 22 November 2010
- Recorded: August 2008–2010
- Studio: RAK, London; State of the Ark, London; Assault & Battery 2, London
- Genre: Alternative rock, garage rock
- Length: 3:13
- Label: Mute
- Songwriter(s): Nick Cave, Grinderman
- Producer(s): Nick Launay, Grinderman

Grinderman singles chronology
| "Heathen Child" (2010) | "Worm Tamer" (2010) | "Palaces of Montezuma" (2011) |

"Worm Tamer" is a song by alternative rock group Grinderman, written collectively by the band with lyrics by frontman Nick Cave and music by Warren Ellis, Martyn P. Casey and Jim Sclavunos. The song was released as the band's fifth single and second single from their second studio album, Grinderman 2, on 22 November 2010. The song was debuted live on the BBC music programme, Later... with Jools Holland, on 21 September 2010, alongside the former single "Heathen Child" and succeeding single "Palaces of Montezuma."

== Background and production ==
Speaking of the song, several members of Grinderman described it as:

"one of the most extraordinary songs I've (Nick Cave) ever been involved in in all the years of making music"; "a decidedly freakish number: a catchy paean to the female Other who grows more formidable from verse to verse"; and "very dense. It's one that's going to be interesting to play live."

Written during album's sessions in 2008, the song received initial release in September 2010 on the Grinderman 2.

== Critical reception ==
The song was described on Pitchfork as "almost comically lascivious" with Popmatters further adding that "the industrial clang and jungle sweat on "Worm Tamer", which sounds the most uncontrolled, but holds its shape until the end".

== Track listing and formats ==
Digital download

1. "Worm Tamer" – 3:13

Limited edition 12" vinyl

1. "Worm Tamer" – 3:13
2. "Worm Tamer" (UNKLE remix)
3. "Worm Tamer" (A Place to Bury Strangers remix)

== Musicians and personnel ==
Grinderman

- Nick Cave – lead vocals, electric guitar, organ, piano, production
- Warren Ellis – acoustic guitar, viola, violin, electric bouzouki, electric mandolin, backing vocals, production
- Martyn Casey – bass guitar, acoustic guitar, backing vocals, production
- Jim Sclavunos – drums, percussion, backing vocals, production

Technical personnel

- Nick Launay – production, engineering
- Kevin Paul – co-production
- Tom Hough – assistant production (at State of the Ark)
- David "Saxon" Greenep – assistant production (at State of the Ark)
- Russell Fawkus – assistant production (at Assault & Battery 2)
