= More News from Nowhere =

Single by Nick Cave and the Bad Seeds

from the album Dig, Lazarus, Dig!!!
- Released: 12 May 2008
- Label: Mute Records
- Songwriter(s): Nick Cave, Martyn P. Casey, Warren Ellis, Jim Sclavunos
- Producer(s): Nick Launay

Nick Cave and the Bad Seeds singles chronology
"Dig, Lazarus, Dig!!!" (2008)	"More News from Nowhere" (2008)	"Midnight Man" (2008)

"More News from Nowhere" is the 28th single by Australian rock band Nick Cave and the Bad Seeds and the second single from the album Dig, Lazarus, Dig!!!. The song has a melodic similarity to "Deanna" from the 1988 album Tender Prey and the song also mentions the character of Deanna. The title is a reference to novel News From Nowhere by William Morris. The "narrative" of the song follows that of the Odyssey, using modern names for the gods and nymphs in the original.

== Music video ==
The video was directed by British artists Iain Forsyth and Jane Pollard, who also directed videos for the other singles from this album. It was filmed at the Raymond Revuebar and featured cameo appearances from author Will Self, actors Michael Higgs, Caroline Catz and Karl Theobald, socialite Peaches Geldof, singer/songwriter Beth Orton, British artists Tim Noble and Sue Webster and bass player for The Wonder Stuff Mark McCarthy along with a number of burlesque dancers. The video was cut to the full-length album version of the song, running to over seven minutes.

== Track listing ==
1. "More News from Nowhere"
2. "Fleeting Love"
3. "Night of the Lotus Eaters" (extended; video) – 7:09

== Chart performance ==
Chart (2008)	Peak position
UK Singles Chart	171

== See also ==
- Nick Cave and The Bad Seeds discography
