= Welcome Back to Milk =

Studio album by Du Blonde
- Released: 18 May 2015
- Recorded: 2015
- Genre: Alternative rock
- Length: 35:59
- Label: Mute
- Producer: Jim Sclavunos; Youth for Big Life Management; Beth Jeans Houghton

Du Blonde chronology
Yours Truly, Cellophane Nose (2012)	Welcome Back to Milk (2015)	Lung Bread for Daddy (2019)

Singles from Du Blonde
- 1. "Black Flag" Released: 2015; 2. "Hunter" Released: 2015

Welcome Back To Milk is the second studio album by Beth Jeans Houghton and the first for her as Du Blonde, to be released in the United Kingdom on 18 May 2015 (and on May 19 in the United States), by Mute Records. The album was written, composed, and performed by Du Blonde and produced by Bad Seed and Grinderman member Jim Sclavunos.

== Background ==
After Beth Jeans Houghton's debut album Yours Truly, Cellophane Nose's release in 2012, she and the band toured extensively, performed at high-profile musical events, including Glastonbury, The Great Escape, Latitude and Bestival. In November 2012, midway through recording the follow-up in Los Angeles with The Hooves of Destiny, the crisis broke out. "When I listened back to what we’d recorded, I didn't see any of myself in it… None of it was angry, none of it was sad. I wasn't being true to myself," the singer said, speaking to The Observer. She broke up the band and ditched her name, opting for a different sound, described as "spiky, propulsive" and "exhilarating." This drastic move had been preceded by a breakdown she had in the summer of 2012 in a Zürich hotel room, during a European tour. "I felt my head go. It was the scariest thing. It felt like my brain was melting," Houghton remembered. After several months of dieting and meditating she completely recovered.

"This is a new sound, a new project. Du Blonde is a new incarnation and one step closer to assuming my ultimate form. Having freed myself from the rusty and bloody shackles of Beth Jeans Houghton – both musically and spiritually – I felt it only right to step forth under a new name and let the rituals commence," Houghton stated, explaining the moniker conversion. Asked what has prevented her from playing louder on Yours Truly, Cellophane Nose, Du Blonde said: "I think a lot of it had to do with the way I learnt how to write and play guitar. I taught myself, and therefore had no concept of time signatures and keys, so often my songs would turn out pretty experimental because, well, they were experiments… Due to the complex or odd nature of the songs I was writing, putting distortion on things just didn’t work. To make the best of a raw, overdriven sound, I needed to keep it simple, which is only something I learned once I had a better grasp on chord progressions and rhythms."

== Artwork ==
The photograph used on the cover (credited to Tommy Chavannes) was 'a castoff' from a shoot she's done with her friends, Houghton explained.

These are people I've known since I was in my mid-teens, we’ve always dressed up and made things together, so the picture was a product of that… This album is a very honest one, and one on which I decided to be unashamedly myself and the picture represents that really well. It was a moment when I had no concept of other people seeing it, so I’m relaxed and I think a lot of my humor comes through. The intention was not a sexual one. I was trying to pose like the captain of a football team…

Houghton said it was important to her not to Photoshop it: "I spent so many of my younger years worried about stretch marks and cellulite that it felt good to finally be in a position to say, 'I don’t care', and I think it's crucial that young girls see other girls not only showing what society and the media would deem as flaws, but being confident that these things are natural."

== Critical reception ==
Professional ratings
Aggregate scores
Source	Rating
Metacritic	73/100
Review scores
Source	Rating
Allmusic	3.5/5 stars
Consequence of Sound	67/100
Drowned in Sound	4/5 stars
The Guardian	3/5 stars
The Line of Best Fit	8.5/10 stars
Mojo	3/5 stars
New Musical Express	4/5 stars
Pitchfork	74/100
Q	3/5 stars
The Skinny	4/5 stars
Uncut	4/5 stars
Under the Radar	6.5/10 stars

Upon its release, Welcome Back To Milk received positive reviews from most music critics. Metacritic, which assigns a normalized rating out of 100 to reviews from mainstream critics, reports an average score of 73, based on 12 reviews.

"Clearly, Houghton's found fertile ground in connecting with her inner rage monster, but there's a different side to the album too: anthemic glam rock reminiscent of Bowie's work with guitarist Mick Ronson," noted NME's Dan Stubbs in his 4/5 rating review. Commenting on Future Islands' Samuel T. Herring's guesting on "My Mind Is on My Mind", Stubbes noticed "a clear kinship: Future Islands have managed to sneak something out-there into the mainstream; thanks to this strong set, Du Blonde should do the same."

"Welcome Back to Milk gives Du Blonde's blisteringly creative mind space to experiment, and her edits show immaculate choice," Nina Corcoran of Consequence of Sound wrote, praising the artist's voice and inventiveness. "Du Blonde is a triumph on nearly every level and her new MO (in short – loud guitars, rage) is a blast," opined The Skinny's Gary Kaill. "There aren't many musicians in the country as creative and as interesting as her at this point in time, and Welcome Back To Milk represents another triumph in her weird and wonderful saga," Drowned in Sound reviewer Paul Brown concluded, providing another 4/5 rating.

Houghton "has managed to marry her way with a melody and an arresting image with a splash of ire and a dollop of heartbreak, resulting in a hugely likeable and enjoyable whole," according to Jude Clarke of The Line of Best Fit. The reviewer enjoyed both "an effective and judicious deployment of swears, always enjoyable," and "some more nuanced shades." "Houghton has a wonderful singing voice, gifted with subtlety in its delivery and a great range. And she uses it to convey a range of emotions, subtly as well as furiously," she added, giving the album the 8.5/10 rating.

"While she possesses a silvery voice that would sound right at home on album after album of Yours Truly''s ethereal folk-pop, her transformation from Beth Jeans Houghton's soap bubble iridescence to Du Blonde's biker jacket toughness is surprisingly effective," writes Allmusic. "While something suggests Houghton isn't done surprising her listeners, Welcome Back to Milk is so intriguing that they'll be impatient to hear whatever she has to offer," reviewer Heather Phares suggested.

== Track listing ==
All tracks are written by Du Blonde.

No.	Title	Length
1.	"Black Flag"	2:56
2.	"Chips To Go"	2:27
3.	"Raw Honey"	2:59
4.	"After the Show"	3:58
5.	"If You're Legal"	2:59
6.	"Hunter"	3:17
7.	"Hard To Please"	2:44
8.	"Young Entertainment"	2:55
9.	"Mr. Hyde"	2:50
10.	"Four In the Morning"	2:58
11.	"Mind is On My Mind"	2:36
12.	"Isn't It Wild"	3:20
