= Heathen Child =

Single by Grinderman

from the album Grinderman 2
- Released: 6 September 2010
- Recorded: August 2008–2010
- Studio: RAK, London, UK; State of the Ark, London; Assault & Battery 2, London
- Genre: Alternative rock, garage rock
- Length: 5:01
- Label: Mute Records/ANTI-
- Songwriters: Nick Cave, Grinderman
- Producers: Nick Launay, Grinderman

Grinderman singles chronology
"(I Don't Need You To) Set Me Free" (2007)	"Heathen Child" (2010)	"Worm Tamer" (2010)

"Heathen Child" is the fourth single by alternative rock group Grinderman and first from their second studio album, Grinderman 2. Released on 6 September 2010, the song is the first release from Grinderman in three years and is also the band's first limited-edition double a-side single.

== Background and production ==
Singer Nick Cave spoke of the song with Uncut magazine, mentioning that "Heathen Child" was "a quest to break from narrative song-writing in to something more impressionistic."

On 27 July 2010 the final studio version of the song was previewed on music website SoundCloud by Mute Records.

== Critical reception ==
The song was described on Sonic Masala as "squalid, diseased, filthy, and oh so seductive."

== Track listing and formats ==
Digital download

1. "Heathen Child" – 5:01

Limited edition 12" vinyl

1. "Heathen Child" – 5:01
2. "Star Charmer"
3. "Super Heathen Child"

== Music video ==
A series of trailers for the album directed by John Hillcoat have been released on Grinderman's official website and by Mute Records since 28 June 2010. Recorded near Westway in London, the music video for "Heathen Child" features a "naked lady lying in a bath of something milky." Cave explained elements of the music video noting that "the video follows the fortunes of a worringly young white girl as she sits in a bath, confronted by the panoply of fiends that occupy her subconscious." The video premiered on NME's Video Box on 9 August 2010.

== Musicians and personnel ==
Grinderman

- Nick Cave – lead vocals, electric guitar, organ, piano, production
- Warren Ellis – acoustic guitar, viola, violin, electric bouzouki, electric mandolin, backing vocals, production
- Martyn Casey – bass guitar, acoustic guitar, backing vocals, production
- Jim Sclavunos – drums, percussion, backing vocals, production

Guest musicians

- Robert Fripp – electric guitar on "Super Heathen Child"

Technical personnel

- Nick Launay – production, engineering
- Kevin Paul - co-production
- Tom Hough - assistant production (at State of the Ark)
- David "Saxon" Greenep - assistant production (at State of the Ark)
- Russell Fawkus - assistant production (at Assault & Battery 2)

== Chart positions ==
Chart (2010–11)	Peak position
France (SNEP)	41
UK Coalition (Official Charts Company)	1
US Hot Singles Sales (Billboard)	19
