= Grinderman 2 =

Studio album by Grinderman
- Released: 13 September 2010
- Recorded: August 2008–2009
- Studios: RAK, London; State of the Ark, London; Assault & Battery 2, London
- Genres: Alternative rock; noise rock; garage rock
- Length: 41:17
- Label: Mute
- Producers: Nick Launay, Grinderman

Grinderman chronology
Grinderman (2007)	Grinderman 2 (2010)

Singles from Grinderman 2
- 1. "Heathen Child" Released: 6 September 2010; 2. "Worm Tamer" Released: 22 November 2010; 3. "Palaces of Montezuma" Released: 14 March 2011; 4. "Evil" Released: 16 April 2011; 5. "Mickey Mouse and the Goodbye Man" Released: 13 June 2011

Grinderman 2 is the second and final studio album by alternative rock band Grinderman, a side project of Nick Cave and the Bad Seeds, released on 13 September 2010 on Mute Records in the United Kingdom and ANTI- in the United States.

At the ARIA Music Awards of 2011, the album was nominated for Best Adult Alternative Album.

== Background and production ==
Grinderman had been put on hold due to the members' involvement on Nick Cave and The Bad Seeds' fourteenth studio album, Dig, Lazarus, Dig!!!, in 2008. After the Nick Cave and the Bad Seeds summer tour in 2008, the band began recording the album in various studios throughout London. Speaking to XFM, Cave noted that the album "will feature a totally different sound" and plan to "do it a more serious way this time"; he remarked that he did not plan for the album to receive commercial success.

Recording was completed in August 2009—a year after the original sessions—production was completed in April 2010 at Seedy Underbelly in Los Angeles, and the album was produced by Nick Launay, a friend of the band, who had also produced Grinderman's self-titled debut, with additional production by the members of the band. In an interview with The Quietus in September 2009, Warren Ellis confirmed that Grinderman 2 was completed. Ellis also described the album as "like stoner rock meets Sly Stone via Amon Düül", "very diverse", and "psychedelic". The album was released in September 2010, in a regular and a deluxe edition, the latter containing a 52-page booklet (illustrations by Ilinca Höpfner) and a poster (photography by Polly Borland).

== Singles ==
The album's first single, "Heathen Child", was released in September 2010. The music video was directed by long-time collaborator John Hillcoat. "Worm Tamer", the second single, was released on 22 November. The music video was directed by Iain Forsyth and Jane Pollard.

== Critical reception ==
Professional ratings
Aggregate scores
Source	Rating
AnyDecentMusic?	8.1/10
Metacritic	83/100
Review scores
Source	Rating
AllMusic	4/5 stars
The A.V. Club	B+
The Guardian	4/5 stars
The Independent	5/5 stars
Los Angeles Times	3.5/4 stars
NME	8/10
Pitchfork	8.1/10
Q	4/5 stars
Spin	9/10
Uncut	4/5 stars

Grinderman 2 received mostly positive reviews, with some critics finding the album superior to its predecessor, Grinderman, and holds an 83 score on Metacritic, denoting "universal acclaim". Thom Jurek of AllMusic said it was a "more polished and studied affair than its predecessor" and "more sonically adventurous" while still being a "white-hot rock and roll record". It has been described as "full of nightmares, but nightmares worth repeating." Garry Mulholland of BBC Music said that Grinderman 2 had a sound, influenced as much by 60s garage punk and droning Krautrock as the blues."

== Track listing ==
All lyrics are written by Nick Cave; all music is composed by Grinderman.

No.	Title	Length
1.	"Mickey Mouse and the Goodbye Man"	5:42
2.	"Worm Tamer"	3:14
3.	"Heathen Child"	5:01
4.	"When My Baby Comes"	6:50
5.	"What I Know"	3:21
6.	"Evil"	2:57
7.	"Kitchenette"	5:19
8.	"Palaces of Montezuma"	3:34
9.	"Bellringer Blues"	5:32
Total length:		41:17

iTunes bonus tracks
No.	Title	Length
10.	"Super Heathen Child" (featuring guest musician Robert Fripp)	6:30
11.	"Fire Boy" (non-LP track)	4:52
12.	"Evil" (Factory Floor Remix #2)	5:32
13.	"Heathen Child" (Andrew Weatherall Bass Remix)	6:50

The iTunes LP will also include bonus videos of "Heathen Child", seven trailers for the album, directed by John Hillcoat and Ilinca Hoepfner and a digital booklet complete with lyrics.

== Personnel ==
Grinderman

- Martyn Casey – bass guitar, acoustic guitar, backing vocals, assistant production
- Nick Cave – vocals, electric guitar, organ, piano, art direction, assistant production
- Warren Ellis – acoustic guitar, viola, violin, electric bouzouki, electric mandolin, backing vocals, assistant production
- Jim Sclavunos – drums, percussion, backing vocals, assistant production

Production personnel

- Russell Fawkus – assistant production (at Assault & Battery 2)
- David "Saxon" Greenep – assistant production (at State of the Ark)
- Tom Hough – assistant production (at State of the Ark)
- Nick Launay – production, engineering
- Kevin Paul – assistant production

Art personnel

- Polly Borland – photography
- Tom Hingston – art direction
- Ilinca Höpfner – illustration

== Chart positions ==
=== Weekly charts ===
Chart (2010)	Peak position
Australian Albums (ARIA)	9
Austrian Albums (Ö3 Austria)	13
Belgian Albums (Ultratop Flanders)	1
Belgian Albums (Ultratop Wallonia)	15
Danish Albums (Hitlisten)	10
Dutch Albums (Album Top 100)	16
European Albums Chart	14
Finnish Albums (Suomen virallinen lista)	20
French Albums (SNEP)	38
German Albums (Offizielle Top 100)	26
Irish Albums (IRMA)	23
Italian Albums (FIMI)	25
New Zealand Albums (RMNZ)	15
Norwegian Albums (VG-lista)	16
Scottish Albums (Official Charts)	11
Spanish Albums (Promusicae)	46
Swedish Albums (Sverigetopplistan)	24
Swiss Albums (Schweizer Hitparade)	38
UK Albums (Official Charts)	14
US Billboard 200	38

=== Year-end charts ===
Chart (2010)	Position
Belgian Albums (Ultratop Flanders)	91

== Release history ==
Region	Date	Format
Worldwide	13 September 2010	CD, limited edition CD, LP, digital download
United States	14 September 2010	CD, limited edition CD, LP, digital download
