= Jeon Joonho =

South Korean artist (born 1969)

- Born: 1969 (age 56–57)
- Education: Dong-eui University; Chelsea College of Art and Design

Korean name
- Hangul: 전준호
- RR: Jeon Junho
- MR: Chŏn Chunho

Jeon Joonho, THE WHITE HOUSE, 2005-2006, Digital Animation, 32 min 16 sec

Jeon Joonho (Korean: 전준호; born 1969) is a South Korean artist.

== Education ==
Jeon received his Bachelor of Fine Arts from Dong-eui University in Busan, South Korea and Master of Arts from Chelsea College of Art and Design in London, United Kingdom.

== Exhibitions ==
Jeon participated in multiple exhibitions including Gwangju Biennale in 2004 and Escape Louis Vuitton, Paris Metamorphosis in 2008. In 2009, Jeon's early political video work The White House (2005–2006) was part of a group exhibition Your Bright Future: 12 Contemporary Artists from Korea in LACMA, Los Angeles. This exhibition was co-curated by Lynn Zelevansky, Christine Starkman and Kim Sunjung. The White House was written in Time Out New York and LA Times. Jeon Joonho started collaborating with another fellow Korean artist, Moon Kyungwon and exhibited their works across America, including a large-scale exhibition News From Nowhere: Chicago Laboratory in Sullivan Galleries at the School of the Art Institute of Chicago (2013). Jeon and Moon's most recent collaborative video work, The New Ways of Folding Space and Flying was installed at the Korean Pavilion for 2015 Venice Biennale. Jeon currently works and resides in Busan, South Korea.
