= No Pussy Blues =

Single by Grinderman

from the album Grinderman
- Released: 19 February 2007
- Recorded: March 2006
- Studio: RAK, London
- Genre: Alternative rock, garage rock
- Length: 4:20
- Label: Mute Records/ANTI-
- Songwriters: Nick Cave, Grinderman
- Producers: Nick Launay, Grinderman

Grinderman singles chronology
"Get It On" (2007)	"No Pussy Blues" (2007)	"(I Don't Need You To) Set Me Free" (2007)

Alternate cover
- iTunes and digital download remixes cover

"No Pussy Blues" is the second single by alternative rock group Grinderman from their debut album of the same name. Released on 19 February 2007, the song - like the previous single "Get It On" - received a positive reception from critics. Unlike the previous Grinderman single, this one charted, peaking at UK #62. "No Pussy Blues" was also the first song available on the band's MySpace page.

== Background and meaning ==
The lyrics address the narrator's frustration at constant rejection as he attempts several different tactics to seduce a woman and sleep with her. When asked during an interview whether the song had a deeper meaning, Nick Cave replied "no, it's just about not getting any pussy when I grew my mustache."

The single's b-side, "Chain of Flowers", was first available on the leaked version of the album from 2006, yet it failed to make the final track list.

== Critical reception ==
The song, alike the album itself, received very positive reviews, with BBC Music describing it as:

a fierce dirge about getting no loving from some frigid Chihuahua-toting starlet - despite Cave's best entreaties: 'I read her Eliot, I read her Yeats, I tried my best to stay up late, I fixed the hinges on her gate, but still she just never wanted to...'

During an appearance on the late-night talk/variety show Late Night with Conan O'Brien on 5 October 2007 Snoop Dogg said that he is a fan of the song, noting he is a fan of a song on Nick Cave's album, Grinderman, however "I can't say the name on the air."

== Track listing and formats ==
- UK and European CD singles (MUTE 373, ICD MUTE 373)
1. "No Pussy Blues" - 4:23
2. "Chain of Flowers" - 3:35
- UK 7" limited edition single (MUTE 373)
1. "No Pussy Blues" (radio edit) - 4:16
2. "Chain of Flowers" - 3:35
- Digital download remixes
1. No Pussy Blues (Adam Freeland remix) – 5:41
2. No Pussy Blues (Midfield General remix) – 7:59
3. No Pussy Blues (T.Raumschmiere vox edit) – 4:11
4. No Pussy Blues (G.e.R.M. remix) – 4:46
5. No Pussy Blues (Electronic Periodic radio edit) – 3:57

* The digital download remixes were released on 5 December 2008 via both the iTunes Store and Mute Download Store.

== Music video ==
A promotional music video for the song was released in May, 2007. It features the band performing the song at a house party and other shots of the Grinderman monkey, animals mating and a couple having sex. The video was directed by John Hillcoat and the band's performance portion of the video was shot in black and white, with other shots being shot in colour.

== Musicians and personnel ==
- Nick Cave – lead vocals, electric guitar, organ, piano, artwork
- Warren Ellis – acoustic guitar, viola, violin, electric bouzouki, electric mandolin, backing vocals
- Martyn Casey – bass, acoustic guitar, backing vocals
- Jim Sclavunos – drums, percussion, backing vocals
- Nick Launay – producer, engineer
- Grinderman – additional production
- Tim Young – mastering
- Tom Hingston Studio – design/artwork
- Polly Borland – photography
