= Beth Jeans Houghton =

English musician, artist, animator and video director

Du Blonde
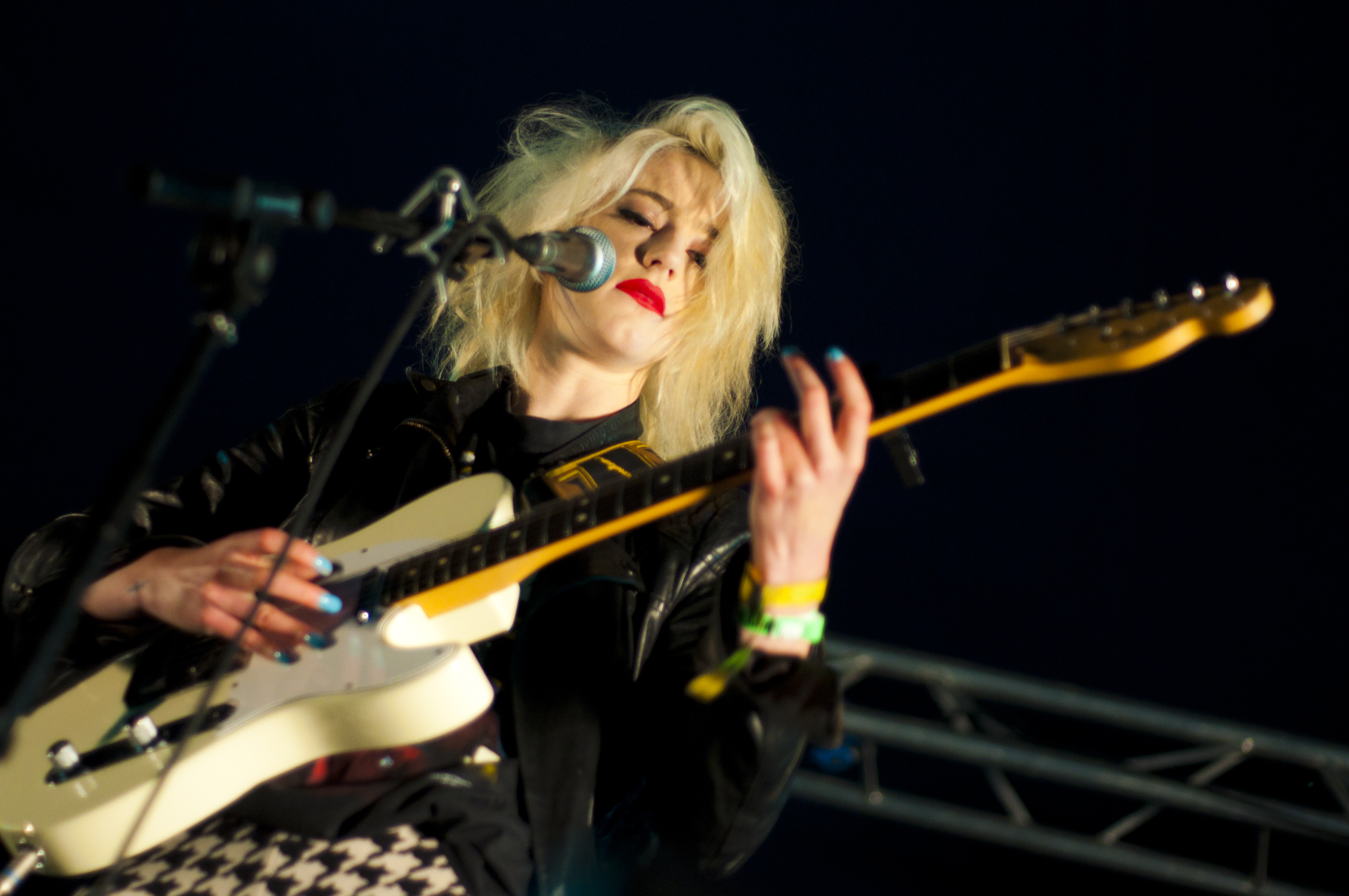
- Beth Jeans Houghton aka Du Blonde

Background information
- Born: 3 January 1990 (age 36); Newcastle upon Tyne, England
- Genres: Psychedelic rock, garage rock, punk rock, pop
- Occupations: Singer-songwriter, animator, artist
- Labels: Mute, Static Caravan, Moshi Moshi

Beth Jeans Houghton (a.k.a. Du Blonde) (born 3 January 1990) is an English multi-disciplinary musician, composer, artist, animator and video director. Their influences range from psychedelic rock, punk, blues, 1960s garage rock and soul. They create art under their birth name, Beth Jeans Houghton, using photography, illustration, animation, video, sculpture and embroidery. They have directed and animated music videos for multiple artists including the Red Hot Chili Peppers, Ezra Furman, and Laura Marling's band LUMP. They write, perform and produce music under the name Du Blonde.

== Biography ==
Beth Jeans Houghton was born in Newcastle upon Tyne, England. Houghton started writing songs in their teens. At sixteen, they left school and bought a Fender Stratocaster, which they taught themselves to play.

Houghton first appeared in front of an audience in 2006; their debut release, titled EP (a limited-edition 7-inch), was on Bird Records in 2008. They signed then with Static Caravan Recordings, which released the single "Golden"/"Nightswimmer", produced by Adem, and their second EP, Hot Toast, Vol. 1 (produced by Mike Lindsay of the band Tunng), both of which earned acclaim from the UK press. Houghton signed in early 2011 with Mute Records, releasing their debut long-player, Yours Truly, Cellophane Nose in early 2012. The album was recorded with Ben Hillier whose previous production credits include Blur, Depeche Mode and Elbow.

Yours Truly, Cellophane Nose by Beth Jeans Houghton and the Hooves of Destiny was released on 6 February 2012, and reached number 83 in the UK Albums Chart.

Houghton and the Hooves of Destiny toured the UK and Europe extensively during 2011 and 2012, appearing at multiple festivals including Glastonbury, The Great Escape, Latitude and Bestival. In April 2012, the band performed on Later... with Jools Holland alongside Paul Weller and Willis Earl Beal.

After touring supporting Welcome Back To Milk, Houghton began work on issue 1 of their comic books series 'Butt Hurt', focusing on bringing to life their vivid dreams and uncomfortable social situations. Having been a lifelong sufferer of anxiety, Houghton's work often touches upon discomfort, using humour to help ease their symptoms and dispel stigma surrounding mental health.

During November 2016, Houghton directed and illustrated the animated music video for "Sick Love" by the Red Hot Chili Peppers. Houghton had previously dated the band's singer Anthony Kiedis. The video was released on 4 December 2016.

On 27 March 2018, Houghton's music video for Ezra Furman's "Suck The Blood From My Wound" was released via the Bella Union label. Houghton directed, illustrated and animated the clip.

On 20 November 2018, LUMP released the video for their single "May I Be The Light", also directed, illustrated and animated by Houghton.

=== Du Blonde ===
During 2014, Houghton began writing and recording music under the name Du Blonde.

Welcome Back To Milk, the debut album for Houghton as Du Blonde, recorded in London and Los Angeles with producer Jim Sclavunos, was released on 19 May 2015 by Mute Records. It garnered favourable reviews, with 75/100 rating at Metacritic.

Du Blonde's second album, Lung Bread for Daddy, was released on 22 February 2019 via Moshi Moshi. The album is the first to be produced by Houghton, taking a journey into relationships and mental health of the musician.

Du Blonde's third album, titled Homecoming, was released in early 2021. The album, self-produced by Houghton, will feature guest artists including Shirley Manson, Andy Bell, Ezra Furman, and members of Tunng. Lead single "Medicated", featuring Manson, was released in November 2020, and follow-up "I'm Glad That We Broke Up", with Furman, came out on 4 February 2021.

Du Blonde's fourth album, titled Sniff More Gritty, was released on 15 November 2024.

== Personal life ==
In 2013, Houghton suffered from anxiety. Of their practice of Transcendental Meditation, begun at this time, they said, "To now know confidently I can deal with my anxiety is such a good place to be." Houghton is non-binary and transgender.

== Discography ==
=== Albums ===
- Yours Truly, Cellophane Nose (2012) no. 83 UK
- Welcome Back to Milk (2015, as Du Blonde)
- Lung Bread for Daddy (2019, as Du Blonde)
- Homecoming (2021, as Du Blonde)
- Sniff More Gritty (2024, as Du Blonde')

=== EPs ===
- EP – June 2008
- Hot Toast Vol 1 – September 2009

=== Singles ===
- "Golden / Nightswimmer" – Static Caravan, 2009
- "Dodecahedron" – Mute, 2011
- "Sweet Tooth Bird" – Mute, 2012
- "Atlas" – Mute, 2012
