= News from Nowhere =

1890 novel by William Morris

News from Nowhere (or An Epoch of Rest)
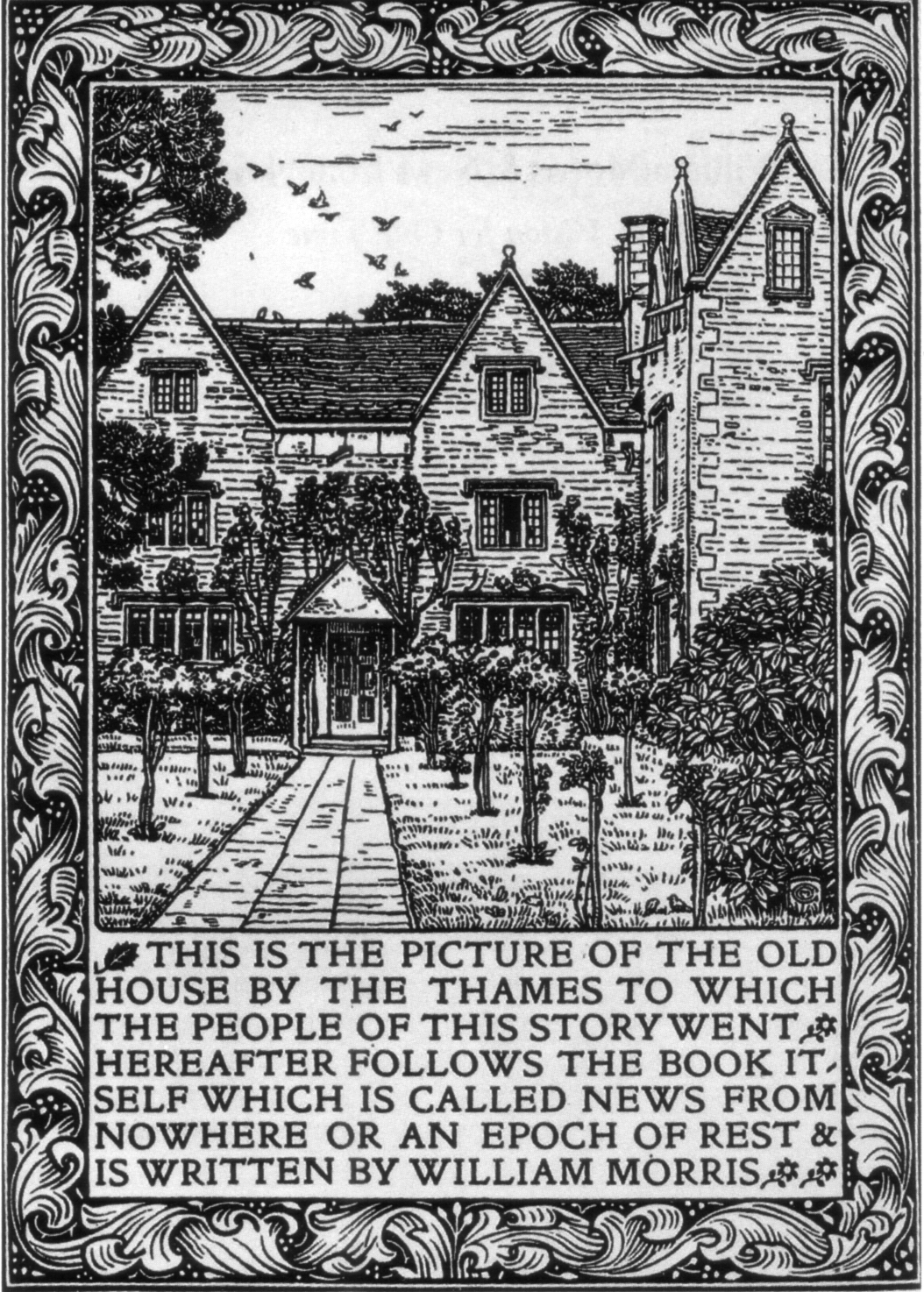
- Frontispiece
- Author: William Morris
- Language: English
- Genre: Science fiction Novel
- Publisher: NA
- Publication date: 1890
- Publication place: United Kingdom
- Media type: Print (Hardback, Paperback)
- Pages: 186

News from Nowhere is an 1890 novel combining utopian socialism and soft science fiction written by the artist, designer and socialist pioneer William Morris. It was first published in serial form in the Commonweal journal beginning on 11 January 1890.

In the novel, the narrator William Guest falls asleep after returning from a meeting of the Socialist League and awakes to find himself in a future society based on common ownership and democratic control of the means of production. In Morris's society, there is no private property, no big cities, no authority, no monetary system, no marriage or divorce, no courts, no prisons, and no class systems. The society functions simply because the people find pleasure in nature, and therefore they find pleasure in their work.

The novel explores various aspects of this imagined society, including its organisation and the relationships which it engenders between people. The book offers Morris's answers to a number of frequent objections to socialism, and underscores his belief that socialism will entail not only the abolition of private property but also an end to divisions between art, life, and work.

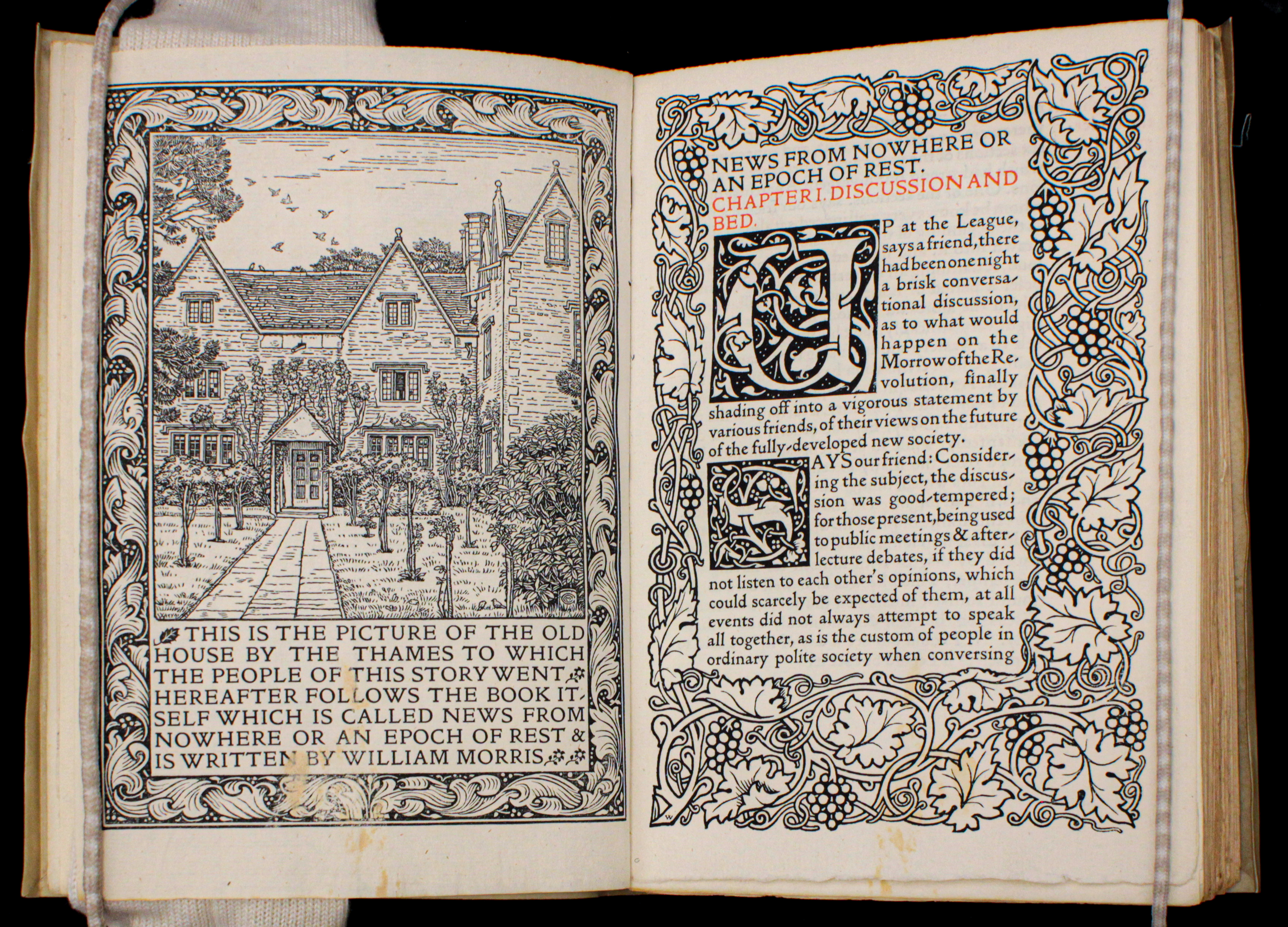
William Morris, News from Nowhere: Or, an Epoch of Rest (London, Kelmscott Press, 1892); Pequot Library Special Collections

In the novel, Morris tackles one of the common criticisms of socialism: the supposed lack of incentive to work in a socialist society. Morris's response is that all labour should be creative and pleasurable. He differed in that regard from most socialist thinkers, who tended to view labour as a necessary burden, but argued that a well-planned, egalitarian society could reduce the amount of labour required from each worker.

News from Nowhere was written as a libertarian socialist response to Edward Bellamy's popular novel Looking Backward (1888), which exalted a type of industrialised state socialism that Morris abhorred. Morris was also seeking to influence the currents of thought at the time regarding the optimal tactics to bring about socialism.

== Background: Looking Backward ==
On 21 June 1889 in Commonweal, Morris reviewed Edward Bellamy's novel Looking Backward, which popularised belief in utopian socialism. In his review, Morris not only criticised the specifics of Bellamy's imagined society—especially its conception of how labour would be performed—he also objected to the fact that Bellamy's portrait was taken to be an authoritative account of what socialists believe:

In short a machine life is the best which Mr. Bellamy can imagine for us on all sides; it is not to be wondered at then that this, his only idea for making labour tolerable is to decrease the amount of it by means of fresh and ever fresh developments of machinery ... I believe that this will always be so, and the multiplication of machinery will just multiply machinery; I believe that the ideal of the future does not point to the lessening of men's energy by the reduction of labour to a minimum, but rather the reduction of pain in labour to a minimum, so small that it will cease to be pain; a dream to humanity which can only be dreamed of till men are even more completely equal than Mr. Bellamy's utopia would allow them to be, but which will most assuredly come about when men are really equal in condition.

As Ben Davis writes, Morris deemed Looking Backward to be "too celebratory of the industrial side of progress and not attentive enough to the pastoral."

Morris also faulted Bellamy for a limited view of life, identifying five areas—work, technology, centralisation, cities, arts—which typified the "half change" advanced in Looking Backward. Morris's review proposed an alternate future society that would address each of these areas. The proposals he outlined became the basis for his vision of utopia in News from Nowhere.

== Gender roles ==
Of gender and the division of labour, Ruth Levitas writes:

In News from Nowhere Morris describes women in the society as "respected as a child bearer and rearer of children, desired as a woman, loved as a companion, un-anxious for the future of her children" and hence possessed of an enhanced "instinct for maternity". The sexual division of labour remains intact. Women are not exclusively confined to domestic labour, although the range of work they undertake is narrower than that of man; but domestic labour is seen as something for which women are particularly fitted. Moreover, "The men have no longer any opportunity of tyrannising over the women, or the women over the men; both of those took place in old times. The women do what they can do best and what they like best, and the men are neither jealous nor injured by it." The practice of women waiting on men at meals is justified on the grounds that, "It is a great pleasure to a clever woman to manage a house skilfully, and to do so that all house-mates about her look pleased and are grateful to her. And then you know everybody likes to be ordered about by a pretty woman..."

Morris presents a society in which women are relatively free from the oppression of men; while domestic work, respected albeit gender-specific in Morris's work here as elsewhere, is portrayed as a source of potential pleasure and edification for all denizens of his utopia.

== Marriage ==
Morris offers a Marxist view of marriage and divorce. Dick and Clara were once married with two children. Then Clara "got it in her head she was in love with someone else", so she left Dick only to reconcile with him again. Old Hammond informs the reader that there are no courts in Nowhere, no divorce in Nowhere, and furthermore no contractual marriage in Nowhere. In Nowhere, people live as they please in groups of varying sizes, and the nuclear family is not necessary.

== Education ==
In Morris's utopia, there is no formal schooling for children. People are free to choose their own form of education. Children in Nowhere

often make up parties, and come to play in the woods for weeks together in the summer time, living in tents, as you see. We rather encourage them to do it; they learn to do things for themselves, and get to know the wild creatures; and you see the less they stew inside houses the better for them.

In this passage, Morris breaks away from the traditional educational institutions of 19th century England. Instead, learning through nature is the style best suited for his idealised agrarian society.

== Environment ==
The state of England's environment is a motif throughout the book, with the conditions in and around the River Thames offering a powerful comparison with the industrial era Morris was writing in. In News from Nowhere, nature has been restored everywhere Guest travels, and pollution largely eliminated. In one of the best-known images from the book, what was previously Trafalgar Square has been re-planted as an apricot orchard, just as the surrounding streets of Piccadilly have become gardens:

Amidst all these gardens and houses it was of course impossible to trace the sites of the old streets: but it seemed to me that the main roadways were the same as of old. We came presently into a large open space, sloping somewhat toward the south, the sunny site of which had been taken advantage of for planting an orchard, mainly, as I could see, of apricot-trees, in the midst of which was a pretty gay little structure of wood, painted and gilded, that looked like a refreshment-stall.

== Influence ==
The title News from Nowhere has inspired many enterprises, including a political bookstore in Liverpool, Tim Crouch's theatre company, and a monthly social club. The News from Nowhere Club was founded in 1996 to "challenge the commercialisation and isolation of modern life", taking as its motto Morris's phrase that "Fellowship is life and the lack of fellowship is death." Its patron is Peter Hennessy, historian of government, and it meets monthly in the church hall of St John the Baptist's, Leytonstone, about four km from the house where the artist grew up, now the William Morris Gallery.

Many artistic creations are named "News from Nowhere". Some of these are closely connected to Morris's book, while others simply use the three-word title, or a variant of it. The Arts Council funded a short film in 1978, bringing News to Nowhere to life, starring Timothy West as Morris. It described a fictional trip by Morris up the River Thames, exploring ideas of aesthetics and socialism. The book was adapted by Sarah Woods as a radio play, broadcast by BBC Radio 4 on 25 May 2016.

News from Nowhere was an influencing factor in historian G. D. H. Cole's conversion to socialism. The novel News from Gardenia (2012) by Robert Llewellyn was inspired by News from Nowhere. An April–May 2005 art exhibit at the Lucy Mackintosh Gallery in Lausanne, Switzerland—with six British artists: Michael Ashcroft, Juan Bolivar, Andrew Grassie, Justin Hibbs, Alistair Hudson, and Peter Liversidge—was called "News From Nowhere". Korean artists Moon Kyungwon and Jeon Joonho paid homage to the novel in their collaborative project "News from Nowhere" (2012).

Folk singer Leon Rosselson's song "Bringing the News from Nowhere", from his eponymous 1986 album, is a tribute to Morris. A track on Dig, Lazarus, Dig!!! by Nick Cave and the Bad Seeds (2008) is called "More News from Nowhere". In 2013 the English band Darkstar released an album titled News from Nowhere. In 2008 Waltham Forest commissioned the composer Mike Roberts to create a new community symphony based on the story. Incorporating Morris's axiom of 'art for the people and by the people', the piece was written in collaboration with 180 primary school children, who composed fragments of music that were woven into the final piece. The result was a 90-minute work for children's choir, orchestra and 10 other smaller ensembles. The work was recorded with the artistic support of the William Morris Gallery during 2014-15 for release in June 2015 to commemorate the novel's 125th anniversary.

The animated video "News from Nowhere" (2022, 5 min) by Maltese artist and curator Raphael Vella was loosely inspired by William Morris's novel. Composed of around 1000 frames, this stop-motion animation presented a more dystopian version of the narrative, in which the artist wakes up to a world on fire. The animated video was on display in 2023 at Valletta Contemporary in Malta.

The opera New Year by Sir Michael Tippett was strongly influenced by Morris's book.

== See also ==
- Erewhon — 1872 utopian novel and satire on Victorian society by Samuel Butler
- Looking Backward — 1888 novel by Edward Bellamy in which the American protagonist falls asleep in 1887 and awakens in a socialist utopia in 2000
- List of books about anarchism
