= Dig, Lazarus, Dig!!! (song) =

Single by Nick Cave and The Bad Seeds

from the album Dig, Lazarus, Dig!!!
- Released: 18 February 2008
- Recorded: June–July 2007
- Genre: Garage rock
- Length: 4:11
- Label: Mute Records
- Songwriter: Nick Cave
- Producer: Nick Launay

Nick Cave and The Bad Seeds singles chronology
"Get Ready for Love" (2004)	"Dig, Lazarus, Dig!!!" (2008)	"More News from Nowhere" (2008)

"Dig, Lazarus, Dig!!!" is a song written by Nick Cave and was released by Nick Cave and the Bad Seeds as a single on 18 February 2008. The song, like much of the band's recent work, was produced by Nick Launay. The song has been available on the band's official website since Christmas Day, 2007, and the video has been viewable on the website since early January. In a journal available at the Nick Cave Exhibition, it is revealed that an earlier version was instead about a man who was dead, who when he was saying "I don't know what it is but there's definitely something going on upstairs" referring to continuing brain activity.

The song debuted on the UK Singles Chart on 24 February 2008 at number 66. It also appeared as number 35 on Triple J Hottest 100 for 2008.

== Music video ==
The video for the song was directed by Iain Forsyth and Jane Pollard and features Cave strutting towards the camera, singing the song, whilst images of New York pass by him. During the chorus, the images of New York are replaced by the members of the Bad Seeds dancing to the song. The video is available on the band's website.

== Track listing ==
All songs by Nick Cave.

- 7" (MUTE377)
1. "Dig, Lazarus, Dig!!!" – 3:38
2. "Accidents Will Happen" – 4:21
- CD (CDMUTE377)
1. "Dig, Lazarus, Dig!!!" – 3:38
2. "Accidents Will Happen" – 4:21
3. "Dig, Lazarus, Dig!!!" (video)

== Chart performance ==
Chart performance for "Dig, Lazarus, Dig!!!"
Chart (2008)	Peak position
Australia (ARIA)	116
Belgium (Ultratop 50 Flanders)	22
UK Singles (OCC)	66
