= Lung Bread for Daddy =

Studio album by Du Blonde
- Released: 22 February 2019
- Length: 38:20
- Label: Moshi Moshi

Du Blonde chronology
Welcome Back to Milk (2015)	Lung Bread for Daddy (2019)

Singles from Lung Bread for Daddy
- 1. "Angel" Released: 16 January 2019

Professional ratings
Aggregate scores
Source	Rating
Metacritic	76/100
Review scores
Source	Rating
AllMusic	4/5 stars
DIY	4/5 stars
NME	4/5 stars
Pitchfork	7.6/10

Lung Bread for Daddy is the third studio album by English musician Beth Jeans Houghton and the second under their musical project Du Blonde. It was released on 22 February 2019 through Moshi Moshi Records.

== Track listing ==
No.	Title	Length
1.	"Coffee Machine"	3:21
2.	"Take Out Chicken"	2:08
3.	"Peach Meat"	4:04
4.	"Holiday Resort"	2:53
5.	"Baby Talk"	3:03
6.	"Angel"	3:01
7.	"Buddy"	2:26
8.	"Heaven Knows"	3:15
9.	"RBY"	3:36
10.	"Acetone"	3:51
11.	"Days Like These"	3:11
12.	"On the Radio"	3:31

== Charts ==
Chart	Peak position
UK Independent Albums (OCC)	24
