= Grinderman (album) =

Studio album by Grinderman
- Released: 5 March 2007
- Recorded: March 2006
- Studios: RAK and Metropolis in London, United Kingdom
- Genres: Alternative rock, garage rock
- Length: 40:03
- Label: Mute/ANTI-
- Producers: Nick Launay, Grinderman

Grinderman chronology
Grinderman (2007)	Grinderman 2 (2010)

Singles from Grinderman
- 1. "Get It On" Released: 8 January 2007; 2. "No Pussy Blues" Released: 17 February 2007; 3. "(I Don't Need You To) Set Me Free" Released: 30 April 2007

Grinderman is the debut studio album by alternative rock band Grinderman, a side project of members of Nick Cave and the Bad Seeds, released on 5 March 2007 on Mute Records in Europe and ANTI- in the United States. Aiming to recreate the more raw, primal sound of all former related projects such as The Birthday Party, Grinderman's lyrical and musical content diverged significantly from Nick Cave's concurrent work with The Bad Seeds, whose last studio album, Abattoir Blues/The Lyre of Orpheus (2004), was primarily blues, gospel and alternative-orientated in stark contrast to the raw sound of the early Bad Seeds albums. Incidentally, the musical direction of Grinderman influenced The Bad Seeds' next studio album, Dig, Lazarus, Dig!!! (2008).

According to producer Nick Launay, the recording sessions for the album only lasted four days, during which time the band also recorded a number of extra material. One song "Chain Of Flowers" was later featured as the B-side to the album's "No Pussy Blues" single, however, the other two singles, "Get It On" and "(I Don't Need You To) Set Me Free" were released as single-sided singles. Upon its release, Grinderman received critical acclaim and charted internationally, debuting at number one on Billboard Heatseakers in the United States.

== Background and production ==
After extensive touring throughout 2005 with The Bad Seeds in support of Abattoir Blues/The Lyre of Orpheus, frontman Nick Cave began writing songs on guitar, an instrument he would rarely play. His rudimentary playing gave the new material a rawer feel than much of The Bad Seeds' output. After more experimentation, Grinderman formed and soon entered Metropolis Studios in London to record the original Grinderman demos and it was this material that would eventually become the basis for Grinderman. The album was recorded with long-time friend, producer Nick Launay in April at the RAK Studios in London and mixed in October at Metropolis Studios.

Warren Ellis has commented that the album was "meant to be really open liberating thing" and the band decided to experiment during the recording of the album "and push on, relentless." Cave's additional guitar was also noted to have "changed the whole dynamic of the [project]."

== Critical reception ==
Professional ratings
Aggregate scores
Source	Rating
Metacritic	83/100
Review scores
Source	Rating
AllMusic	4/5 stars
The A.V. Club	B
Entertainment Weekly	B+
The Guardian	4/5 stars
Mojo	4/5 stars
NME	7/10
Pitchfork	7.7/10
Q	3/5 stars
Spin	4/5 stars
Uncut	4/5 stars

Released on 5 March 2007, Grinderman was acclaimed by critics for its raw power, similar to that of Cave's celebrated post-punk project The Birthday Party. The album holds a score of 83 out of 100 on review aggregate site Metacritic based on 33 independent reviews, indicating "universal acclaim".

== Promotion ==
The band made their live debut at the All Tomorrow's Parties Festival in Somerset the month following the album's release. This was followed by a one-off show at The Forum in London on 20 June. Three singles were released from the album, "Get It On" was the first single to be released on 8 January 2007. "No Pussy Blues" was released as a single on 19 February, and on 30 April, the band released the final single from the album, "(I Don't Need You To) Set Me Free".

Grinderman also opened for The White Stripes at their Madison Square Garden show on 24 July 2007, followed by a show in Chicago, and two shows in San Francisco. The band then embarked on a theatre tour of Australia, opening for a Nick Cave 'solo' set, which consisted of the same band members. The band also launched the official Grinderman website in March 2007 in promotion of the album. Amongst other things, the website included The Grinderman Podcast featuring a series of fragments of recordings from the band's writing sessions. These were not complete songs but instead were seen to offer a unique insight into the workings of the band. New episodes were said to appear regularly over the following weeks and months, however, only five recordings have been submitted at this time.

On 11 May 2007, the band performed "Honey Bee (Let's Fly to Mars)" and "No Pussy Blues" on the BBC television show Later... with Jools Holland and made their US network television debut on the CBS television show the Late Show with David Letterman performing "Honey Bee (Let's Fly to Mars)" on 23 July 2007. Grinderman were one of the headliners at Roskilde Festival 2008 in July, one of the biggest festivals in northern Europe. They joined names such as Radiohead, Neil Young and Jay-Z at the top of the bill.

In 2014, the song "Honey Bee (Let's Fly to Mars)" appeared in the HBO show True Detective where it was played at the end of the episode "Who Goes There?".

== Track listing ==
All lyrics are written by Nick Cave; all music is composed by Grinderman.

No.	Title	Length
1.	"Get It On"	3:07
2.	"No Pussy Blues"	4:20
3.	"Electric Alice"	3:15
4.	"Grinderman"	4:33
5.	"Depth Charge Ethel"	3:47
6.	"Go Tell the Women"	3:24
7.	"(I Don't Need You To) Set Me Free"	4:06
8.	"Honey Bee (Let's Fly to Mars)"	3:18
9.	"Man in the Moon"	2:10
10.	"When My Love Comes Down"	3:32
11.	"Love Bomb"	4:26
Total length:		40:03

== Personnel ==
Grinderman

- Nick Cave – vocals, electric guitar, organ, piano
- Warren Ellis – acoustic guitar, electric mandolin, viola, violin, electric bouzouki, backing vocals
- Martyn Casey – bass, acoustic guitar, backing vocals
- Jim Sclavunos – drums, percussion, backing vocals

Technical personnel

- Nick Launay – producer, engineer
- Grinderman – additional production
- Dom Morley – engineer
- Matt Lawrence – engineer
- James Aparicio – assistant engineer
- Tim Young – mastering
- Rohan Onraet – technician

Design personnel

- Polly Borland – photography
- Tom Hilingston – design

== Charts and certifications ==
=== Charts ===
Chart (2007)	Peak position
Australian Charts	14
Austrian Charts	14
Belgian Charts	6
Dutch Charts	35
Greek Charts	1
New Zealand Charts	38
Swedish Charts	46
Swiss Charts	49
UK Charts	23
U.S Billboard Heatseekers	1
U.S Billboard Independent Albums	15

=== Certifications ===
Country	Certification
Greece	Gold

"Honey Bee (Let's Fly to Mars)" also reached #97 on Rolling Stone's list of the "100 Best Songs of 2007".
