= Yours Truly, Cellophane Nose =

Studio album by Beth Jeans Houghton
- Released: 6 February 2012
- Recorded: 2011
- Genre: psychedelic folk, alternative rock
- Length: 34:35
- Label: Mute
- Producer: Ben Hillier

Beth Jeans Houghton chronology
| Yours Truly, Cellophane Nose (2012) | Welcome Back To Milk (2015) |

Singles from Yours Truly, Cellophane Nose
- 1. "Liliputt" Released: 14 November 2011; 2. "Sweet Tooth Bird" Released: 20 February 2012; 3. "Atlas" Released: 23 April 2012

Yours Truly, Cellophane Nose is the debut studio album by Beth Jeans Houghton recorded with the Hooves of Destiny and released in the United Kingdom on 6 February 2012 (on 28 February 2012 in the United States), by Mute Records. The album was produced by Ben Hillier, noted for his works with Blur, Elbow and Depeche Mode, among many others.

"Liliputt" (b/w "Your Holes") was released as the album's lead single on 14 November 2011. It was followed by "Sweet Tooth Bird" (b/w "Telephone") on 20 February 2012, the song about "sabotaging a relationship that's too good." On 23 April (with a special Record Store Day release on the 21st) came out the third single "Atlas", accompanied by black-and-white video directed and produced by Beth Houghton's friend Juan Iglesias in Los Angeles.

== Critical reception ==
Professional ratings
Aggregate scores
| Source | Rating |
|---|---|
| Metacritic | 79/100 |
Review scores
| Source | Rating |
| AllMusic | 4/5 stars |
| BBC Music | 4/5 stars |
| Clash | 9/10 stars |
| Consequence of Sound | 8/10 |
| Drowned In Sound | 8/10 stars |
| The Guardian | 4/5 stars |
| The Independent on Sunday | 3/5 stars |
| Mojo | 4/5 stars |
| musicOMH | 8/10 stars |
| The Observer | 4/5 stars |
| Q | 4/5 stars |
| The Telegraph | 4/5 stars |
| Uncut | 4/5 stars |

Upon its release, Yours Truly, Cellophane Nose received generally favourable reviews. Metacritic, which assigns a normalized rating out of 100 to reviews from mainstream critics, reports an average score of 79, based on 17 reviews.

"Her debut album has been a long time coming, but the two-year wait has yielded an end product that's been caringly crafted well beyond what you'll hear on most first albums," wrote Alex Young of Consequence of Sound, describing the album's psychedelic folk as "an alluring, heady trip, at times recalling a Court and Spark-era Joni Mitchell with shades of David Bowie's Hunky Dory lurking in the wings."

"While Houghton's debut Yours Truly, Cellophane Nose has just as much whimsy as the title suggests, it's not all spun-sugar fantasies (though there are plenty of those). Her voice has a richness and maturity that anchor her flights of fancy, while the carnival-chamber-folk that surrounds it adds freshness and fun," according to Allmusic. "Just over 30 minutes long, it shows that Houghton knows how to leave listeners wanting more," concluded Heather Phares her 4/5 rating review.

Clash noticed "a wicked streak that runs through Yours Truly..." "That the departing words on the album are 'F**k off!', courtesy of the rampant Pogues-like hidden final track, is entirely appropriate - she may not take life too seriously, but when it comes to making divine music, Beth means business," Simon Harper concluded, giving the album 9/10 rating.

The Quietus' Jeremy Allen found Yours Truly, Cellophane Nose "...an album of scope and unbridled invention, drawing from the past (in both music and aesthetics) to create a universe of sounds and textures that are quite unlike anything around at the moment," where "[s]pace is used wisely so that choral singing and violins and harps can all live together without ever sounding too cluttered; something that is no mean feat."

The Observer praised "the straight-up gorgeousness of Beth Jeans Houghton's unorthodox folk," while The Guardian saw this debut "as a kind of Beth in Wonderland, comprising martial beats, lullaby strings and Houghton's wide-eyed vocals, accented by lyrics Lewis Carroll might write – if he were a 21-year-old Geordie woman."

"It is not very often that an artist comes along that is so strikingly unique and hugely talented and with Yours Truly, Cellophane Nose Beth Jeans Houghton has made a beguilingly lovely debut album that shows immense promise," stated musicOMH. "Lyrics concerned with both majesty and minutiae are backed by feverishly entwining guitar, keyboard, percussion and strings. But it is Houghton's silken vocal that really sets it apart," remarked The Telegraph's Tim Burrows.

The least impressed of the 17 Metacritic-featured mainstream reviewers were those of PopMatters and The Independent on Sunday, both with a 3/5 rating. "Yours Truly, Cellophane Nose has an intriguing grab bag mentality, but one wonders if a little focus would help in making Houghton's music more memorable," wrote Maria Shurr of the former. While Simon Price found the singer's style "almost absurdly ill-matched to her songs." "Occasionally diverting but predominantly trivial lyrics are coupled with portentous choirs, Enya-like strings and much pseudo-operatic hooting. If Mute wanted their own Florence, then for better or worse, they've found her," The Independent's writer opined.

== Track listing ==
All tracks are written by Beth Jeans Houghton & the Hooves of Destiny / Beth Jeans Houghton.

| No. | Title | Length |
|---|---|---|
| 1. | "Sweet Tooth Bird" | 2:10 |
| 2. | "Humble Digs" | 2:10 |
| 3. | "Dodecahedron" | 3:13 |
| 4. | "Atlas" | 4:07 |
| 5. | "Nightswimmer" | 3:43 |
| 6. | "The Barely Skinny Bone Tree" | 4:02 |
| 7. | "Liliputt" | 4:09 |
| 8. | "Veins" | 2:56 |
| 9. | "Franklin Benedict" | 3:19 |
| 10. | "Carousel" | 3:57 |
