= Get It On (Grinderman song) =

Single by Grinderman

from the album Grinderman
- Released: 8 January 2007
- Recorded: March 2006 at RAK Studios, London, United Kingdom
- Genre: Alternative rock, garage rock
- Length: 3:07
- Label: Mute Records/ANTI-
- Songwriters: Nick Cave, Grinderman
- Producers: Nick Launay, Grinderman

Grinderman singles chronology
"Get It On" (2007)	"No Pussy Blues" (2007)

"Get It On" is the first single by alternative rock group Grinderman - a side project of the Australian post-punk group Nick Cave and The Bad Seeds - from their self-titled debut album Grinderman. Released on 8 January 2007, the song received positive reception from music critics, though failed to chart.

== Critical reception ==
The song, alike the album itself, received very positive reviews, with SPIN noting that:

["Get It On"] takes a more raw, experimental approach to songwriting, and offers fans a listen to a first: Cave as a primary guitarist. While Cave & the Bad Seeds specialize in slick, darkly sexy rumblings somewhere between the Doors and Leonard Cohen, Grinderman's "Get It On" offers a study in contrast, with its blues bravado and loud, ragged riffs.

== Track listing ==
- UK 7" limited single (MUTE 370)
1. "Get It On" - 3:07
- Digital single
1. "Get It On" - 3:07

== Musicians and personnel ==
- Nick Cave – lead vocals, electric guitar, organ, piano, artwork
- Warren Ellis – acoustic guitar, viola, violin, electric bouzouki, electric mandolin, backing vocals
- Martyn Casey – bass, acoustic guitar, backing vocals
- Jim Sclavunos – drums, percussion, backing vocals
- Nick Launay – producer, engineer
- Grinderman - additional production
