= The Vanity Set =

Indie rock group

- Origin: New York, New York, United States
- Genres: Indie
- Years active: 2000–present
- Label: CARGO UK
- Members: Jim Sclavunos; Peter Mavrogeorgis; Jennifer Carey; David Morton; Tam Ui; Sasha Kazachkov; Jaiko Suzuki

The Vanity Set
Review scores
Source	Rating
NME	3.5/5 stars

Little Stabs of Happiness
Review scores
Source	Rating
Uncut	3/5 stars

The Vanity Set is an indie rock group composed mostly of second-generation Greek-Americans. It was formed in New York City in 2000. Led by Jim Sclavunos, the drummer/percussionist with Nick Cave and the Bad Seeds, they describe their music as a blend of "low art, high sass and raw bluster." Their music includes the sounds of rebetiko, "psycho-billy guitar, creepy keys, raucous tuba, and mellifluous theremin."

By 2022, Sclavunos told an interviewer for NME that the project was complete. He also said in 2021 that he had a set of unfinished Vanity Set material that he was working on releasing.

== Current members ==
- Jim Sclavunos - lead vocals
- Peter Mavrogeorgis - guitar, bouzouki
- David Morton - keyboards, clarinet
- Tam Ui - drums
- Sasha Kazachkov - bass
- Jennifer Carey - tuba & dead-bird-in-bag wrangler
- Jaiko Suzuki - percussion

== Previous members ==
- Meredith Yayanos - violin, theremin
- David Berger - drums, percussion
- David Clifford - drums
- Brian Emrich - bass, synthesizer, ondioline

== Discography ==
- The Vanity Set (2000)
- Little Stabs of Happiness (2003)
- The Big Bang (7" single, 2005)
