= Dig, Lazarus, Dig!!! =

Studio album by Nick Cave and the Bad Seeds
- Released: 3 March 2008
- Recorded: June–July 2007
- Genres: Gothic rock; post-punk; garage rock
- Length: 53:35
- Labels: Mute; ANTI-
- Producers: Nick Launay, Nick Cave and the Bad Seeds

Nick Cave and the Bad Seeds chronology
The Abattoir Blues Tour (2007)	Dig, Lazarus, Dig!!! (2008)	Live at the Royal Albert Hall (2008)

Singles from Dig, Lazarus, Dig!!!
- 1. "Dig, Lazarus, Dig!!!" Released: 18 February 2008; 2. "More News From Nowhere" Released: 12 May 2008; 3. "Midnight Man" Released: 28 July 2008

Dig, Lazarus, Dig!!! is the fourteenth studio album by Australian rock band Nick Cave and the Bad Seeds. The album was recorded in June and July 2007 at The State of the Ark Studios in Richmond, London and mixed by Nick Launay at British Grove Studios in Chiswick, and was released on 3 March 2008.

It was the last album to feature founding member Mick Harvey, who left the Bad Seeds in 2009, and organist James Johnston, who left the band before the support tour. It was also the second without founding member Blixa Bargeld. Dig features the same personnel as the Abattoir Blues / The Lyre of Orpheus double album (though the involvement of both Johnston and pianist Conway Savage is dramatically reduced). It is also the first to be released since the Bad Seeds side project Grinderman released their eponymous album. In several interviews Cave stated the album would "sound like Grinderman," implying a garage rock sound. In line with this approach, the album was recorded in about five days, an uncommonly short period for a full-length album from the band.

Dig, Lazarus, Dig!!! features artwork by British artists Tim Noble and Sue Webster. At the J Awards of 2008, the album was nominated for Australian Album of the Year.

== Concept ==
On the band's official website Cave wrote about his inspiration for the album:

Ever since I can remember hearing the Lazarus story, when I was a kid, you know, back in church, I was disturbed and worried by it. Traumatised, actually. We are all, of course, in awe of the greatest of Christ's miracles—raising a man from the dead—but I couldn't help but wonder how Lazarus felt about it. As a child it gave me the creeps, to be honest. I've taken Lazarus and stuck him in New York City, in order to give the song, a hip, contemporary feel. I was also thinking about Harry Houdini who spent a lot of his life trying to debunk the spiritualists who were cashing in on the bereaved. He believed there was nothing going on beyond the grave. He was the second greatest escapologist, Harry was, Lazarus, of course, being the greatest. I wanted to create a kind of vehicle, a medium, for Houdini to speak to us if he so desires, you know, from beyond the grave.

== Singles and promotion ==
A series of viral video trailers for the album were produced by artists Iain Forsyth and Jane Pollard.

On 18 February the title track "Dig, Lazarus, Dig!!!" was released as the first single—on CD, limited edition 7", and as a digital download—with "Accidents Will Happen" as the B-side. The second single, "More News From Nowhere", was released on 12 May. It draws its title from News from Nowhere, an 1890 utopian socialist novel by William Morris.

An extended promotional video for "Night of the Lotus Eaters" was also released along with a live studio video of "Midnight Man" and a promotional video for "More News From Nowhere", all directed by artists Iain Forsyth and Jane Pollard. The "More News From Nowhere" video released in May 2008, features cameo appearances by journalist Will Self, singer Beth Orton, British TV actors Karl Theobald, Michael Higgs and Caroline Catz plus British artists Tim Noble and Sue Webster and socialite/ broadcaster Peaches Geldof.

== Critical reception ==
Professional ratings
Aggregate scores
Source	Rating
Metacritic	87/100
Review scores
Source	Rating
AllMusic	4.5/5 stars
The A.V. Club	B+
Entertainment Weekly	A−
The Guardian	5/5 stars
The Independent	4/5 stars
NME	8/10
Pitchfork	8.4/10
Q	4/5 stars
Rolling Stone	4/5 stars
Spin	4/5 stars

Critical response to Dig, Lazarus, Dig!!! was overwhelmingly positive, with reviewers acclaiming the album as both a return to greatness and a new side of the band. The album currently holds a score of 87 out of 100 on the review aggregate site Metacritic, which indicates "universal acclaim". A review from NME described Dig, Lazarus Dig!!! as a "gothic psycho-sexual apocalypse" and stated that "just when The Bad Seeds seemed content to settle into middle-age as a cabaret gospel showband – albeit an extraordinary one – they've bared their teeth again". Stephen M. Deusner of Pitchfork stated that "this is how rock musicians are supposed to age". Alastair McKay of Uncut wrote that "the band has never sounded better, and Cave seems to have relaxed into the hysteria of his vocal style; like Elmer Gantry singing Leonard Cohen at a tent-revival." In his Consumer Guide column for MSN Music, Robert Christgau cited "We Call Upon the Author" and "More News from Nowhere" as highlights and called Cave "almost Dylanesque for blessed moments", later giving the album a two-star honorable mention rating.

In a five-star review, The Observer's Graeme Thomson praised Dig, Lazarus, Dig!!! as "a triumph from first to last". David Harris of Tiny Mix Tapes said that "rock, country, blues, and post-punk rhythms meld with Cave’s lyrics on sex, death, God, and America to create what could be one of his most perfect albums yet", while Matt Fink of Paste called the album "vintage Cave." Jason Heller of The A.V. Club said that Dig, Lazarus, Dig!!! "bears little concept or nuance, but it more than makes up for it in raw, oozing passion." Hot Press critic Paul Nolan wrote that the album "is a less sonically abrasive affair than the album Cave released last year with his side-project Grinderman, but it teems with as many musical and lyrical ideas as ever." Drowned in Sound noted that "while there are inevitable parallels what with one album following the last so soon", Dig, Lazarus, Dig!!! was nonetheless "a bolder creation that its predecessor." In a mixed review, Tim Perlich of Now wrote that the band's tendency "to revert to familiar structures and grooves" meant that it was "not surprising, then, that a number of the tunes on Dig, Lazarus, Dig!!! sound familiar", though he acknowledged that "this probably isn't all that troubling to Bad Seeds fans, for whom more of the same is a welcome prospect."

In May 2008, the album was announced as the first nomination for Australian radio station Triple J's 2008 J Awards. The title track was ranked at 35 in the Triple J 2008 Hottest 100 Countdown.

== Awards ==
- 2008 MOJO Awards: Best Album of 2008 (Dig, Lazarus Dig!!!)
- 2008 ARIA Award: Nick Cave Best Male Artist of 2008 (for Dig, Lazarus, Dig!!!)
- Certified Silver for UK sales.
- Certified Gold for Irish sales.

== Track listing ==
All tracks are written by Nick Cave, except where noted.

No.	Title	Writer(s)	Length
1.	"Dig, Lazarus, Dig!!!"		4:11
2.	"Today's Lesson"		4:41
3.	"Moonland"	Nick Cave, Warren Ellis, Martyn P. Casey, Jim Sclavunos	3:53
4.	"Night of the Lotus Eaters"	Cave, Ellis	4:53
5.	"Albert Goes West"	Cave, Ellis	3:32
6.	"We Call Upon the Author"	Cave, Ellis	5:11
7.	"Hold On to Yourself"	Cave, Ellis, Casey, Sclavunos	5:50
8.	"Lie Down Here (& Be My Girl)"		4:57
9.	"Jesus of the Moon"		3:22
10.	"Midnight Man"		5:06
11.	"More News from Nowhere"	Cave, Ellis, Casey, Sclavunos	7:58
Total length:			53:35

== Singles ==
- "Dig, Lazarus, Dig!!!" (MUTE 377) (18 February 2008)
  - b/w: "Accidents Will Happen"
- "More News From Nowhere" (MUTE 390) (12 May 2008)
  - b/w: "Fleeting Love"
- "Midnight Man" (MUTE 403) (28 July 2008)
  - b/w: "Hey Little Firing Squad"

== Personnel ==
- Nick Cave – Vocals (1–11), Organ (1,2,6,7), Piano (3,8,9), Tambourine (3,5,11), Sleigh Bells (3,11), Toms (5), Harmonica (5), Electric Guitar (9), Vibra-Slap (11)
- Martyn P. Casey – Bass (1–3,6–11)
- Thomas Wydler – Brushed Snare (1), Shaker (2,10), Tambourine (2,5,10), Drums (4,8,9), Hand Drums (7)
- Warren Ellis – Viola (1,6,9,11), Loops (1,4,6,7,10,11), Fender Mandocaster (2–4,7–10), Tenor Guitar (3,5,8,10), Maracas (3) 12 String Lute (5), Drum Machine (6), Piano (8), Flute (9), Mandolin (9)
- Mick Harvey – Electric Guitar (1,4–6,10,11), Acoustic Guitar (2,5,7–9), Bass (4,5), Organ (10)
- Jim Sclavunos – Drums (1–3,5–7,10,11), Bongos (1,5), Cowbell (1), Cuica (3), Congas (3,4), Finger Cymbals (4), Shaker (5), Maracas (7), Tambourine (8,9), Sleigh Bells (9)
- James Johnston – Organ (2,5,9), Electric Guitar (5)
- All backing vocals and handclaps by Nick Cave and The Bad Seeds; Conway Savage is listed as a band member but does not play his usual keyboards on the album

== Chart positions ==
Chart (2008)	Peak position
Australian Albums (ARIA)	2
Austrian Albums (Ö3 Austria)	3
Belgian Albums Chart (Vl)	1
Belgian Albums Chart (Wa)	27
Danish Albums (Hitlisten)	4
Dutch Albums (Album Top 100)	10
Finnish Albums (Suomen virallinen lista)	9
French Albums (SNEP)	44
German Albums Chart	6
Irish Albums Chart	5
Italian Albums Chart	12
New Zealand Albums (RMNZ)	5
Norwegian Albums (VG-lista)	2
Polish Albums Chart	19
Portuguese Albums Chart	9
Scottish Albums (Official Charts)	5
Spanish Albums (Promusicae)	22
Swedish Albums (Sverigetopplistan)	3
Swiss Albums (Schweizer Hitparade)	21
UK Albums (Official Charts)	4
US Billboard 200	64
US Top Alternative Albums (Billboard)	17
US Independent Albums (Billboard)	5
US Top Rock Albums (Billboard)	22
US Indie Store Album Sales (Billboard)	3

=== Year-end charts ===
Chart (2008)	Position
Belgian Albums (Ultratop Wallonia)	33
Croatian Albums (HDU)	39
Greek Foreign Albums (IFPI Greece)	27

== Certifications ==
Region	Certification	Certified units/sales
Australia (ARIA)	Gold	35,000^{^}
Ireland (IRMA)	Gold	7,500^{^}
United Kingdom (BPI)	Gold	100,000^{^}
^{^} Shipments figures based on certification alone.
