= Grinderman =

Australian-American rock band

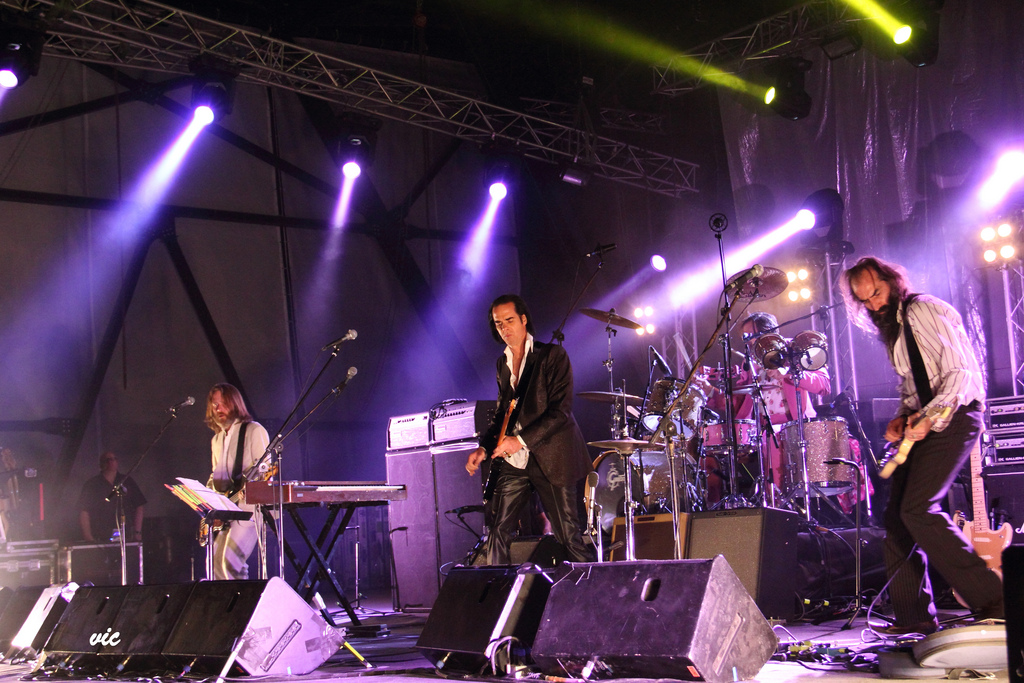
- Grinderman performing live in Athens, Greece, in 2011. Left to right: Martyn P. Casey, Nick Cave, Jim Sclavunos and Warren Ellis.

Background information
- Origin: London, England
- Genres: Alternative rock, garage rock, noise rock, punk blues, psychedelic rock
- Years active: 2006–2011, 2013
- Label: Mute
- Spinoff of: Nick Cave and the Bad Seeds
- Past members: Nick Cave; Warren Ellis; Martyn P. Casey; Jim Sclavunos
- Website: grinderman.com

Grinderman was an Australian-American rock band that formed in London, England, in 2006. The band included Nick Cave (vocals, guitar, organ, piano), Warren Ellis (tenor guitar, electric mandolin, violin, viola, guitar, backing vocals), Martyn P. Casey (bass, guitar, backing vocals) and Jim Sclavunos (drums, percussion, backing vocals).

Formed as a side project to Nick Cave and the Bad Seeds, the band was originally known as Mini Seeds and was formed by Cave as "a way to escape the weight of The Bad Seeds." The band's name was inspired by a Memphis Slim song, "Grinder Man Blues," which Cave is noted to have started singing during one of the band's early rehearsal sessions. The band's eponymous debut studio album, Grinderman, was released in 2007 to highly positive reviews and the band's second and final studio album, Grinderman 2, was released in 2010 to a similar reception.

Following extensive touring after the release of Grinderman 2, Grinderman disbanded after a performance at the Meredith Music Festival in Victoria, Australia in December 2011. The band split up in order to focus on The Bad Seeds' upcoming material. However, Jim Sclavunos later said: "I can't predict what the future of Grinderman is – if there is a future." The band reunited to perform both weekends at the Coachella Valley Music and Arts Festival in Indio, California in April 2013. In July 2019, while answering a fan on his Red Hand Files, Nick Cave hinted that a third album in a "yet to be completed trilogy" was in the works.

== History ==
=== 2006–2008: Formation and debut album ===
After extensive touring throughout 2005 with The Bad Seeds in support of the band's double album, Abattoir Blues/The Lyre of Orpheus, frontman Nick Cave began composing new songs on guitar. He had rarely played the instrument and his rudimentary playing gave the new material a rawer feel than much of The Bad Seeds' output at the time. Cave formed Grinderman with fellow Bad Seeds' musicians Warren Ellis, Jim Sclavunos and Martyn P. Casey to experiment with his new material. He had previously used this same line-up to demo and cowrite material for Abattoir Blues/The Lyre of Orpheus. The newly formed side project entered the Metropolis Studios in London to record the original Grinderman demos and it was this material that would eventually become the basis for the band's eponymous debut album. The album was recorded with long-time friend, producer Nick Launay in April at the RAK Studios, London and mixed in October at the Metropolis Studios.

The band's debut single, "Get It On", was Grinderman's first release on 8 January 2007. "No Pussy Blues", now one of the band's signature songs, was released as the band's second single on 19 February, in order to promote the upcoming album. Grinderman was released in March 2007 and was applauded by critics for its rough energy, similar to that of Cave's celebrated post-punk project The Birthday Party. Alongside its release, the band's official website was unveiled the same week and featured The Grinderman Podcast, a podcast series of recording segments from the band's writing sessions. New episodes were said to appear regularly over the following weeks however, only five recordings appeared. The band made their live debut at the All Tomorrow's Parties Festival in Somerset the following month and on 30 April, the band released the third and final single from the album, "(I Don't Need You To) Set Me Free". Following the eventual releases, the band appeared on the BBC television show Later... with Jools Holland on 11 May, performing "Honey Bee (Let's Fly to Mars)" and "No Pussy Blues." To finish promotion of the album in the United Kingdom, the band ended with a one-off show at The Forum in London on 20 June.

Grinderman made their network television debut in the United States on the CBS television show the Late Show with David Letterman performing "Honey Bee (Let's Fly to Mars)" on 23 July 2007. The band also opened for The White Stripes at their Madison Square Garden show the following day on 24 July 2007, followed by a show in Chicago and two shows in San Francisco. The band then embarked on a theatre tour of Australia, opening for a Nick Cave "solo" set, which consisted of the same band members. Grinderman were one of the headliners at the 2008 Roskilde Festival.

Grinderman also contributed two original songs, "Dream (Song for Finn)" and "Song for Frank", to the soundtrack of the Wim Wenders film Palermo Shooting in 2008. "Honey Bee (Let's Fly to Mars)" plays during the closing credits of True Detective, HBO, Season 1, Episode 4, "Who goes there?", 9 February 2014.

=== 2009–2011: Grinderman 2 and break-up ===
The band had been put on hold due to members' involvement on Nick Cave and The Bad Seeds' fourteenth album, Dig, Lazarus, Dig!!! in 2008. Cave confirmed that a second studio album was planned after The Bad Seeds' summer tour of 2008, however also noted that the follow-up album will feature a totally different sound from its predecessor. Speaking to XFM, Cave explained that Grinderman wanted to do it in a more serious way this time, but still without caring for commercial success. In an interview with The Quietus in September 2009, Warren Ellis confirmed that Grinderman 2 was completed. Ellis also described the album as "like stoner rock meets Sly Stone via Amon Düül", "very diverse", and "psychedelic."

A full-length European tour for autumn 2010 was announced prior to the album's release and included dates in the United Kingdom, Switzerland, Italy and Slovenia. A second tour covering North America in winter 2010 was also announced in August. The second album, Grinderman 2, was then announced for release in September 2010. The album's first single, "Heathen Child", was released on 6 September 2010.

In January 2011, the band made their first appearance at the Big Day Out festival and MONA FOMA. The band was chosen by Portishead to perform at the ATP I'll Be Your Mirror festival that they curated in July 2011 at London's Alexandra Palace.

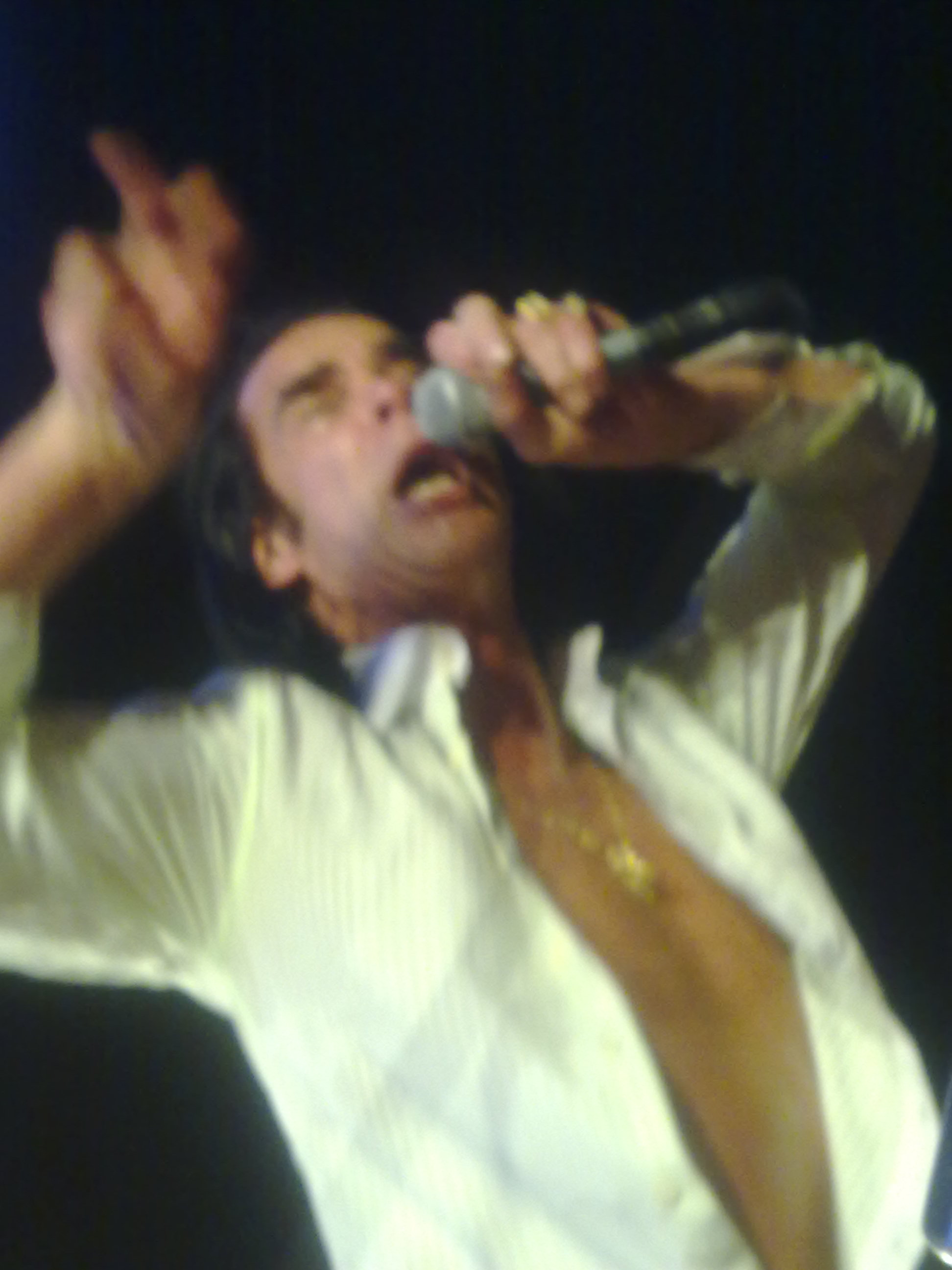
Nick Cave getting into the crowd during the Melbourne Big Day Out 2011

On 11 December 2011, after performing at the Meredith Music Festival in Victoria, Nick Cave announced on-stage that Grinderman were "over," telling the audience: "that's it for Grinderman. It's over. We'll maybe see you all in another ten years, when we'll be even older and uglier." Jim Sclavunos later told FasterLouder that "we were finished with what we had to do as Grinderman and it's time to move on, for now at least, and the next thing we are moving onto is The Bad Seeds" and "I can't predict what the future of Grinderman is – if there is a future."

=== 2013–present: Reunion and possible future ===
Grinderman reunited to perform both weekends at the Coachella Valley Music and Arts Festival in Indio, California on 12 and 19 April 2013. (The Bad Seeds also performed the same weekends.) In a Twitter post earlier that year, Cave explained the unexpected reunion: "Every other shitty band is doing it, why not someone who's actually good".

In 2025, drummer Jim Sclavunos commented on the possibility of the band reforming, stating: "I think me and Warren are very keen. It’s down to Nick if he dares, if he’s man enough, if he’s Grinderman enough! It remains to be seen, but I’ll tell you this much: it’s an awful lot of fun to play in a small ensemble. Grinderman compels you to play in a very different way as a four-piece, compared to a very large band like the Bad Seeds. They’re both great but both different. I hope we do it again."

== Discography ==
- Grinderman (2007)
- Grinderman 2 (2010)

== Awards and nominations ==
=== ARIA Music Awards ===
The ARIA Music Awards is an annual awards ceremony held by the Australian Recording Industry Association.

Year	Nominee / work	Award	Result	Ref.
2011	Grinderman 2	Best Adult Alternative Album	Nominated	

=== J Awards ===
The J Awards are an annual series of Australian music awards that were established by the Australian Broadcasting Corporation's youth-focused radio station Triple J. They commenced in 2005.

Year	Nominee / work	Award	Result
2010	"Heathen Child"	Australian Video of the Year	Nominated
