= Jim Sclavunos =

American drummer

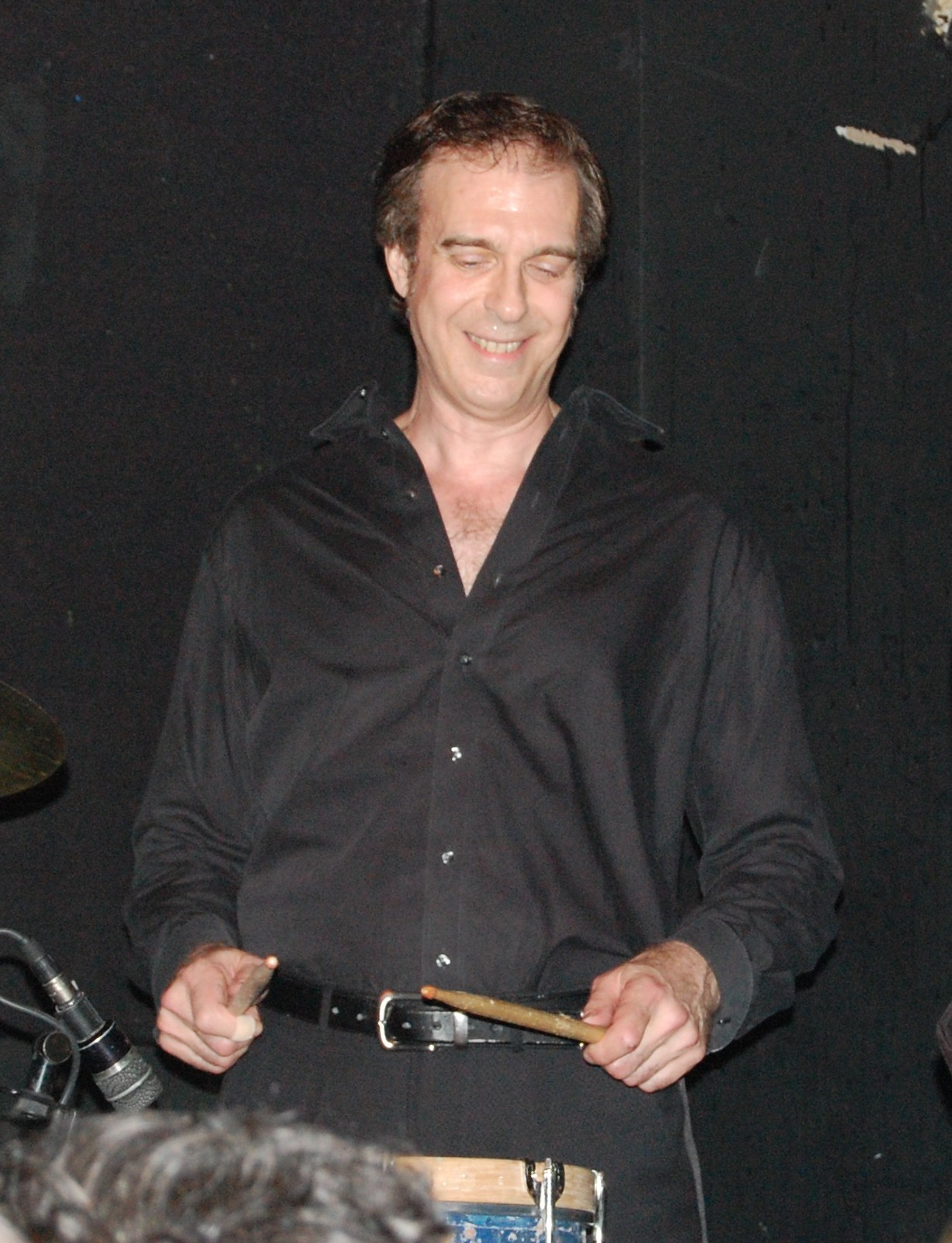
- Sclavunos performing with Teenage Jesus and the Jerks in 2008.

Background information
- Genres: Post-punk; alternative rock; garage rock
- Instruments: Drums; percussion; keyboards; vocals
- Years active: 1978–present
- Label: Mute
- Member of: Nick Cave and the Bad Seeds; The Pogues; Transvision Vamp
- Formerly of: Teenage Jesus and the Jerks; 8 Eyed Spy; Sonic Youth; the Cramps; Grinderman; The Vanity Set
- Website: jimsclavunos.com

James Sclavunos is an American multi-instrumentalist, record producer and writer. He is best known for his work as a drummer, having been a member of two seminal no wave groups in the late 1970s, Teenage Jesus & the Jerks and 8 Eyed Spy, both alongside Lydia Lunch. He is also noted for stints in Sonic Youth and the Cramps, and has been a member of Nick Cave and the Bad Seeds since 1994. Sclavunos has led his own group the Vanity Set since 2000 and was a founding member of the Bad Seeds spinoff band Grinderman.

== Biography ==
Sclavunos, a half-Greek and half-Italian from Marine Park, Brooklyn, New York (known for his exceptional height at 6'7"), was memorably described in the pages of The Wire as an "infamous elegant degenerate". He has long been a prime mover in New York City's vibrant underground music scene, helping to kick-start the vital no wave movement in the late 1970s with Teenage Jesus & the Jerks and 8 Eyed Spy (both with Lydia Lunch), before playing with Sonic Youth and the Cramps. He has also recorded albums with Grinderman, Sonic Youth, Tav Falco's Panther Burns and Congo Norvell as well as recording sessions with many artists including Marianne Faithfull, Iggy Pop, Beth Orton, and Seasick Steve. He has also toured with Lunch, Alex Chilton and Wreckless Eric.

A key member of the Bad Seeds since 1994 and a founding member of the Bad Seeds offshoot Grinderman, he also formed his own New York-based musical ensemble The Vanity Set in 2000, releasing two studio albums to date.

Further to his work as a musician, Sclavunos has produced a wide range of bands including Gogol Bordello, the Horrors, the Jim Jones Revue, Black Moth, and Teenage Mothers (Lead guitarist and co-vocalist Raph Brous has dedicated his upcoming novel, Empire of Ants, to him).

He has done several remixes, both on his own and as one half of Silver Alert (along with Vanity Set bandmate Peter Mavrogeorgis). In 2012, Silver Alert performed "Faustian Pact" at the Perth International Arts Festival in Western Australia, a live adaptation of FW Murnau's film Faust, produced in collaboration with director/choreographer Micki Pellerano.

In 2012, Sclavunos began an ongoing collaboration with Australian performance artist/musician Michaela Davies on a composition titled "FM-2030" (named for the transhumanist philosopher Fereidoun M. Esfandiary) utilizing programmed electro-muscular stimulation of classical string players to generate involuntary playing movements. The composition premiered at the 2013 Sonica Festival in Glasgow.

== Career ==
=== Early years ===
While attending NYU School of Arts, Jim Sclavunos co-founded No Magazine, an underground fanzine devoted to coverage of NY punk rock and the burgeoning No Wave movement. He briefly fronted his own band Mimi And The Dreamboats, before joining No Wave bands Red Transistor, and The Gynecologists with avant-garde composer Rhys Chatham and Nina Canal to play drums. Around the time the Gynecologists were disbanding, Sclavunos joined Lydia Lunch’s band Teenage Jesus and the Jerks as bass guitarist, releasing both an EP Baby Doll (1979) and a compilation mini-album on pink vinyl on Lust/Unlust. A short-lived side-project with Lunch called Beirut Slump featured Sclavunos’ first recorded work as drummer on the group's single "Try Me / Staircase" (1979) on Migraine. Following their European tour in June 1979, Teenage Jesus and the Jerks broke up, and Lydia and Sclavunos joined 8 Eyed Spy.

=== 1980–1986: First album, Sonic Youth, and Trigger & the Thrill Kings ===
In 1980, Sclavunos and Lunch formed a short-lived live blues project, The Devil Dogs. In 1981, following the death of bass player George Scott, 8 Eyed Spy released a self-titled album on Fetish. Sclavunos designed the covers for both the ROIR 8 Eyed Spy release and for Suicide’s Half Alive album (1981). Sclavunos ended up moving to Memphis and joining Alex Chilton's side-project Tav Falco's Panther Burns, ultimately releasing an EP Blow Your Top (1982). The same year he briefly joined Sonic Youth and recorded drums parts for their debut album, Confusion Is Sex, but quit before the sessions were over. He moved on to co-founding Trigger & the Thrill Kings with Dutch singer Truus DeGroot, with the group touring extensively throughout the Netherlands and Germany with various line-ups including Jim Duckworth on guitar and Annene Kaye on keyboards.

=== 1987–1993: Session years and reunion projects ===
Sclavunos recorded with Kid Congo Powers’ band Congo Norvell releasing Lullabies (1992, Fiasco). His recording sessions with The Cramps produced albums Look Mom No Head! (1991, Restless) and EP Blues Fix (1992, Big Beat). In the fall of 1991 Sclavunos left Los Angeles to be reunited with Lydia Lunch, touring Europe with her and Rowland S. Howard under the band name Shotgun Wedding. Live recordings were later released under various titles, including Shotgun Wedding Live in Siberia. Sclavunos both lived in and toured Europe with Wreckless Eric and Tav Falco's Panther Burns in the period 1992 – 1994. While living in Vienna, Austria, he played drums on, and arranged Panther Burns’ Shadow Dancer album in 1992 (released on Intercord in 1995).

=== 1994–99: Nick Cave and the Bad Seeds ===
Following working with Nick Cave and the Bad Seeds member Mick Harvey in a project Harvey was producing, Sclavunos joined the band on the 1994 Let Love In European tour as organist/ percussionist. Sclavunos stayed on for their US Lollapalooza tour and became a permanent member that same year.

With the Bad Seeds, Sclavunos generally plays a variety of auxiliary percussion (e.g. vibraphone, maracas, cowbell, tubular bells), while Thomas Wydler plays a standard drum kit. Sclavunos has also played standard drums, keyboards and other instruments for the Bad Seeds as needed.

Sclavunos recorded his first album as full band member in 1996 with Murder Ballads. Murder Ballads was followed by The Boatman's Call and a tour, before the Bad Seeds entered a hiatus period.

=== 2000–2006: Debut solo album and continuing with the Bad Seeds ===
Sclavunos’ first solo album The Vanity Set is released in 2000 on Naked Spur Productions/Hitchyke, while the same year saw him join The Gunga Din as drummer, touring and playing on their 2nd album Glitterati (2000, Jetset). The following year, No More Shall We Part, Scalvunos' third studio recording with Nick Cave and the Bad Seeds, is released on Mute Records in April 2001.

Sclavunos produced his second solo album, Little Stabs of Happiness (2003, Cargo) under the banner of The Vanity Set. Nick Cave and the Bad Seeds released Nocturama (2003, Anti) and Abattoir Blues / The Lyre of Orpheus (2004, Anti). Throughout this period, Sclavunos toured extensively, drumming with both Nick Cave and the Bad Seeds and in Nick Cave’s solo performances in the stripped-down line-up that would eventually become Grinderman. The same line-up of musicians also recorded several tracks with Marianne Faithfull for her album Before The Poison (2005). Sclavunos played drums and percussion on Nick Cave’s score for the Icelandic theatre company Vesturport’s production of Woyzeck, performed at the Barbican Theatre in London in 2005, as well as a cover version of J.B. Lenoir’s "I Feel So Good" for Wim Wenders’ Martin Scorsese Presents The Blues – The Soul of a Man.

=== 2007–2012: Grinderman, Bad Seeds, and Faustian Pact ===
In 2007, Grinderman, with Sclavunos on drums, released their first self-titled album and debut in the headline slot at All Tomorrow's Parties in April of that year. Sclavunos drummed on Cave's score for the 2007 soundtrack, The Assassination of Jesse James by The Coward Robert Ford, and the following year Nick Cave and the Bad Seeds released their 14th studio album Dig, Lazarus, Dig!!! (Anti), which won the MOJO Honours List Award for Best Album 2008. Grinderman headlined major European festival dates including Roskilde Festival, Latitude Festival, and Summercase. Sclavunos played drums on "Just Like a King", a duet with Seasick Steve and Nick Cave which appeared on Seasick Steve's 2008 album I Started Out with Nothin and I Still Got Most of It Left. Grinderman 2 was released in 2010 and Grinderman toured extensively throughout North America, Europe and Australia. On Valentine's Day 2012 Sclavunos presented Faustian Pact, a multi-media film and live magic ritual performance and musical improvisation piece at The Perth Arts Festival with Micki Pellerano. He co-wrote and contributed vocals and synth to the track "Lost American" from the solo album On the Mat and Off by fellow Bad Seed Thomas Wydler.

=== 2013–2019 ===
In February 2013 Nick Cave and The Bad Seeds released Push the Sky Away (Bad Seed Ltd) and toured the album extensively around the world. At the end of their North American stint, a stripped-down version of the band (including Sclavunos on drums) recorded the album Live from KCRW, which was released that same year. Sclavunos begins his collaboration with Australian musician and performance artist Michaela Davies on a composition utilizing EMS to create involuntary movement in performing musicians. The piece entitled "FM-2030" (and dedicated to the Futurist philosopher of the same name) premiered at the Sydney Opera House in 2013. In 2014 Axels & Sockets (The Jeffrey Lee Pierce Sessions Project) is released with the featured track "Nobody’s City" mixed by Sclavunos, a duet with Iggy Pop and Nick Cave, with guitar by Thurston Moore. More touring ensued for Nick Cave & The Bad Seeds.

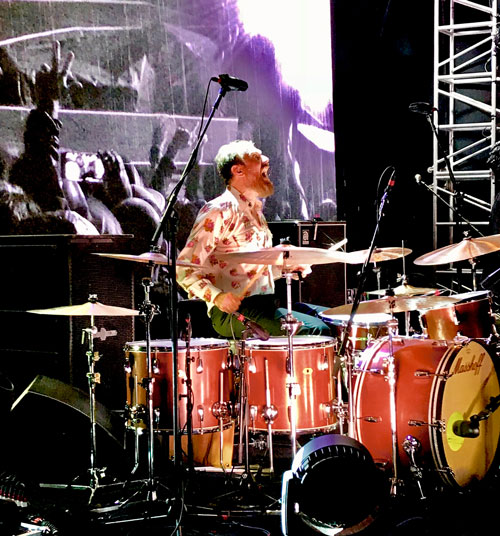
Sclavunos performing in 2018

2016 saw the release of the Nick Cave and the Bad Seeds documentary One More Time with Feeling, as well as the band’s 16th studio album Skeleton Tree. Sclavunos is reunited with Truus DeGroot (recording as Plus Instruments) recording drums for 3 tracks on her 2016 Signal Through the Waves album while on tour with her in São Paulo, Brazil. Extensive international touring with Nick Cave and the Bad Seeds followed the 2017 release of their Lovely Creatures: The Best of Nick Cave and the Bad Seeds, culminating in the release of Distant Sky (Live in Copenhagen), both the concert film and the EP of the same name featuring excerpts from the film. Ghosteen, a double album from Nick Cave and the Bad Seeds released in October 2019.

=== 2020–present: Bad Seeds hiatus and continuing solo work ===
Following the COVID-19 pandemic, Sclavunos has released multiple singles, starting in January 2021 with "Holiday Song", and continuing in April 2022 with a cover of Bob Dylan's "Lay Down Your Weary Tune". He also confirmed that he was working on a solo album prior to the pandemic, and that it would be coming soon. Also in the works is a collaborative album with Nicole Atkins; a lead single, "A Man Like Me" was released in 2019, with the album tentatively being released in 2023.

== Selective list of bands ==
- The Gynecologists (1978)
- Information (1978)
- Red Transistor (1978)
- Teenage Jesus and the Jerks with Lydia Lunch (1978–79)
- Beirut Slump with Lydia Lunch (1978–79)
- 8 Eyed Spy with Lydia Lunch (1979)
- Devil Dogs (1980)
- Sonic Youth (1982-1983)
- Tav Falco's Panther Burns (1983, 1993)
- Trigger & the Thrill Kings (1983–86)
- Congo Norvell (1990–1998)
- The Cramps (1991–92)
- Shotgun Wedding with Lydia Lunch and Rowland S. Howard (1992)
- Nick Cave and the Bad Seeds (1994–present)
- The Gunga Din (1999–2000)
- The Vanity Set (2000–present)
- Grinderman (2006–2011, 2013)
- Silver Alert (2012–present)
- Joe Gideon (2015–present)

== Selected producer credits ==
- Lydia Zamm – Tip The Velvet (1996)
- Boss Hog – "Fear for You" (1999)
- Gogol Bordello – Voi-La Intruder (1999)
- Bellmer Dolls – The Big Cats Will Throw Themselves Over EP (2006)
- The Horrors – "Count in Fives" and "Gloves" (2006), Strange House (2007)
- Beth Orton – "I Me Mine" (2010)
- David J. Roch – Skin & Bones (2011)
- The Jim Jones Revue – Burning Your House Down (2010), The Savage Heart (2012)
- Black Moth – The Killing Jar (2012), Condemned to Hope (2014)
- Freshkills – Raise Up the Sheets (2012)
- The Callas – Am I Vertical (2013), Half Kiss Half Pain (2016)
- Fat White Family – I Am Mark E Smith (2014)
- Lola Colt – Away From the Water (2014)
- Du Blonde – Welcome Back to Milk (2015)
- The Wytches – All Your Happy Life (2016)
- Dolls – Armchair Psychiatrist (2017)
- Pat Dam Smith – The Last King (2019)
- Joe Gideon – Armagideon (2020)

== Selected remix credits as Silver Alert ==
- Grinderman – "Evil ('Silver Alert' Remix)" featuring Matt Berninger of the National (2011)
- S.C.U.M. – "Faith Unfolds (Silver Alert Remix)" (2011)
- Philip Glass – "Etoile Polaire: Little Dipper" – Silver Alert remix on REWORK_Philip Glass Remixed (2012)

== Selected remix credits as Jim Sclavunos ==
- Breathless – "Next Time You Fall (Jim Sclavunos Remix)" (2013)
- Depeche Mode – "Should Be Higher (Jim Sclavunos from Grinderman Remix)" (2013)
- Warhaus – Beaches (Jim Sclavunos Remix)" (2017)
