= Holy Water (The Triffids song) =

- Cover photography by Peter Ashworth

Single by The Triffids

from the album Calenture
- A-side: "Holy Water"
- B-side: "Good Morning, Good Morning"
- Released: August 1988
- Recorded: April–August 1987
- Genre: Indie rock, Folk rock
- Length: 3:26
- Label: Island
- Songwriter(s): David McComb
- Producer(s): Craig Leon

The Triffids singles chronology
"'Trick of the Light'" (1988)	"Holy Water" (1988)	"'Goodbye Little Boy'" (1989)

"Holy Water" was the third single taken from Australian rock group The Triffids' Calenture album, and was released in August 1988. It was produced by Craig Leon (The Ramones, Blondie, The Bangles) and was written by lead guitarist and lead singer David McComb. This was one of only two tracks (the other was "Bury Me Deep in Love") that resulted from Leon's production of the band's fourth album. The production costs of Leon's efforts were more than the total costs of the band's break-through album, Born Sandy Devotional. The record sleeve however credits the production to Gil Norton who produced the remainder of the album with the band. The single was released as 7", 12" and CD single versions by Island Records but failed to chart in either Australia or the United Kingdom.

== Background ==
"Holy Water" is the third single from Australian folk rock group The Triffids' fourth studio album, Calenture. It was released in August 1988. The track was written by lead guitarist and lead singer David McComb. It was produced by Craig Leon (The Ramones, Blondie, The Bangles) and is one of only two tracks (the other was "Bury Me Deep in Love") that resulted from Leon's work for Calenture. Leon had wanted to record all the tracks without the rhythm section of Martyn P. Casey on bass guitar and Alsy MacDonald on drums. According to guitarist and violinist, Robert McComb (David's brother), "Craig Leon didn't understand what we were on about... it becomes arbitrary who plays what, as long as it gets played". While David recalled, "There was a lot of that shit going on last year (1987) ... It's good to have a certain amount of disrespect for these so-called experts".

"Holy Water", set to a shuffling drum machine, hinted at The Triffids’ interest in electronica. The track was remixed by Michael Frondelli. Wilson Neate of Perfect Sound Forever described the track as "euphoric" and cited it as an example of The Triffid's "unbridled pop sensibility [which] emerges – a development that sounds like an organic progression". Mess+Noise's Lauren Zoric felt it was "blissful" and indicative of the album's "devastating ... loveliness".

The B-side, "Good Morning, Good Morning", is the band's cover version of The Beatles' track and was The Triffids's contribution to the 1988 tribute album Sgt. Pepper Knew My Father. On the 12" single, additional tracks are "Red Pony" which is taken from the 1983 album Treeless Plain, and "Raining Pleasure" is from 1984's extended play of the same name. The latter track features lead vocals by keyboardist Jill Birt.

The single was released as 7", 12" and CD single versions but failed to chart in either Australia or the United Kingdom.

== Track listing ==
7" single version
No.	Title	Writer(s)	Length
1.	"Holy Water"	David McComb	3:26
2.	"Good Morning, Good Morning"	John Lennon, Paul McCartney	2:49

12" single and CD single version
No.	Title	Writer(s)	Length
1.	"Holy Water"	David McComb	3:26
2.	"Raining Pleasure"	D McComb	2:27
3.	"Good Morning, Good Morning"	John Lennon, Paul McCartney	2:49
4.	"Red Pony"	D McComb	4:07

== Personnel ==
"Holy Water" is credited to:

The Triffids members

- Jill Birt – keyboards, backing vocals, lead vocals ("Raining Pleasure")
- Martyn P. Casey – bass guitar
- Graham Lee – guitar
- Alsy MacDonald – drums, backing vocals
- David McComb – lead vocals, guitar
- Robert McComb – guitar, backing vocals, violin

Additional musicians

- Sam Brown – backing vocals
- Adam Peters – keyboards

Production details

- Michael Frondelli – remixing ("Holy Water")
- Craig Leon – producer ("Holy Water")
- Gil Norton – producer ("Holy Water")
- Nick Mainsbridge – producer ("Raining Pleasure")
- The Triffids – producer ("Raining Pleasure", "Red Pony")

Art work

- Peter Ashworth – photography
- Lawrence Watson – colour photography
- Island Art – sleeve art
