= Love in Bright Landscapes: The Story of David McComb of the Triffids =

- Directed by: Jonathan Alley
- Written by: Jonathan Alley
- Produced by: Danielle Karulas; Tait Brady
- Starring: David McComb; The Triffids; Paul Kelly; DBC Pierre; Lenny Kaye; Joanne Alach; Sally Collins; Rob Snarski; Adam Peters; Phil Kakulas; Stephen Street; Niall Lucy; Mat Snow
- Cinematography: Danielle Karalus
- Edited by: Tony Stevens; Greg Appel
- Music by: The Triffids; Dalsy; The Victims; David McComb; The Blackeyed Susans; costar
- Production companies: Atticus Media, The Acme Film Company
- Distributed by: Label Distribution (theatrical), Madman Entertainment (home)
- Release date: September 2021
- Running time: 99 mins
- Country: Australia
- Language: English

Love in Bright Landscapes: The Story of David McComb of the Triffids is a feature-length documentary, depicting the life and times of late Australian songwriter David McComb (February 17, 1962 – February 2, 1999) best known for his work with the Triffids, a band he co-founded in Perth, Western Australia. The Triffids were active between 1978 and 1990.

The film was the directorial debut of Melbourne-based writer/broadcaster Jonathan Alley, who also wrote the documentary screenplay. The film was produced by Atticus Media and The Acme Film Company and distributed in the Australian/New Zealand territory by Label Distribution.

The title Love in Bright Landscapes refers both to the Triffids' compilation of the same name, released in 1986, and the poem by Spanish literary figure Rafael Alberti, who published "The Coming Back of Love in Bright Landscapes" in 1973.

== Production ==
Love in Bright Landscapes was completed with the direct support of the McComb family, and with the authorisation of his estate. Initial production and completion phases were supported by Vic Screen. The film uses McComb's own poems, letters and interview snippets as a narrative device, eschewing use of a traditional narrator. Much of the film's testimony and observations come from non-musical figures in his life. Love in Bright Landscapes tells the story of his upbringing in Western Australia, the formative influence of punk rock, literature, and cinema on his music, and depicts his lifelong struggle for recognition (both during his years with The Triffids, and afterward) and the health struggles that lead to his untimely death, in February 1999.

While the film features interviews with McComb's close musical colleagues, including Triffids members Alsy MacDonald, Jill Birt, Martyn P. Casey and Graham Lee, the key interview contributions come from close lifelong friends, lovers and confidantes, including his brother /Triffids guitarist Robert McComb, friend and collaborator Adam Peters, former partner Joanne Alach, manager/confidante Sally Collins, and lifelong friend Phil Kakulas of the Blackeyed Susans (a band McComb co-founded in 1989). Although Love in Bright Landscapes does employ some traditional narrative structures common in documentary, its free-flowing 'magpie aesthetic' was deliberately employed to echo McComb's own approach that allowed wide-ranging stylistic expression, as demanded by his material's needs. The filmmakers also used this approach to divert the film's stylistic approach from so-called conventional 'rock-documentary' methods. The film was created with unprecedented access to family archives, which included 35mm slides and 8mm film, shot by Dr. Harold McComb, (David McComb's late father) in the late 1950s and early 1960s. The film uses these elements to create historical context, and as visual accompaniment to McComb's music at certain junctures.

Love in Bright Landscapes used McComb's poems as a partial narrative device. These posthumous works, published by Fremantle Arts Press as the volume Beautiful Waste, were complemented by newly discovered letters to David's brother John McComb (d.2014). Booker Prize-winning novelist DBC Pierre (Vernon God Little) collaborated with the production to read these works. The filmmakers approached Pierre after reading his contribution to a volume of writings about McComb, entitled Vagabond Holes. The co-editor of both these publications, the late academic Niall Lucy, was a close friend of David McComb's and appears in the film.

The film was also selected as a MIFF Premiere Fund title by Melbourne International Film Festival and thus selected to premiere at the 2021's event, but full premiere screenings were not possible due to conditions created by the COVID-19 pandemic. The film is represented outside the Australia/NZ territory by White Light International Media.

== Subsequent release ==
The film subsequently premiered in McComb's hometown of Perth, Western Australia in September 2021, after special advance screenings at CinefestOZ in Busselton, Western Australia. It was subsequently selected for the Brisbane International Film Festival and London's Doc'n'Roll Festival late 2021, with reprise UK regional screenings in 2022. After a pause created by the COVID-19 pandemic, Sydney and Melbourne premieres were staged. These events also featured musical performances by The Friends of David McComb, a loose amalgamation of musical and friends and colleagues, playing several tracks featured in the film and rare and /or previously unheard compositions by the songwriter. The Sydney show featured former Bad Seeds member Mick Harvey on drums, and a chance appearance by Margaret Labi, reprising her role as sometime guest live vocalist with the Triffids for the first time since 1984.

The film also screened internationally at Cathedral Arts in Belfast in 2022, with subsequent selection for MusikFilm in Copenhagen, Denmark. Love in Bright Landscapes was also official selection in the Music and Film section of The Athens International Film Festival in 2022.

A DVD release in the Australian/New Zealand territory through Madman Entertainment featured over two hours of material not featured in the film, including director/cast Q&A sessions, featurettes, a performance by Melbourne poet Sean M. Whelan of his original work How to Climb Inside a Song, footage shot in 2008 at The Sydney Festival, and interviews with former Triffids Rob McComb and Phil Kakulas. A brief featurette also told the story of Lawson Square Infirmary, a country-flavoured Triffids off-shoot project that released a one-off EP in 1984. A DVD exclusive element, not included on streamed/downloadable versions of the film, lay in the restored version of the 1984 concert film The Night of the Triffids, originally shot as an AFTRS student project by filmmaker Megan Simpson Huberman. The footage was specially restored by Ray Argall of Piccolo Films for the DVD project. The concert film recorded the Triffids performing before the addition of pedal steel player Graham Lee to their line-up, and before their departure to the UK, where they were based until 1989.

In March 2022, a specially created video installation utilising the film's content was added to the permanent exhibition space dedicated to McComb at The Australian Music Vault.

The film was also released on various digital streaming and download platforms in Australia and New Zealand, in July and August 2022 respectively. It was sold to Rialto Channel NZ and screened in October and November 2023, and SBS Viceland in Australia for December 2023 screenings.

== Reviews ==
Critical reaction to Love in Bright Landscapes was positive.

Filmink said the film was "...one of the best music documentaries to ever come out of this country..."

Professor Ted Snell, writing in The Conversation, called the film "...extraordinary ... beautifully told ... the unfurling narrative is driven by an urgent sense of purpose and inspired by McComb's 'magpie aesthetic', where everything makes a connection."

Speaking on Melbourne radio station Triple R FM music writer Jeff Jenkins, said the film was a "documentary masterpiece.... that plays like a Triffids album"

NME Australia called Love in Bright Landscapes "a fitting tribute to a singular Australian talent ... who might finally get the recognition that largely escaped him in life".

David Astle of ABC Radio Melbourne called the film "An intricate and intimate portrait.... a loving document ... thoroughly recommended".

The Athens International Film Festival, on announcing the inclusion of the film, said "This documentary about David McComb, poet and creator of The Triffids, will not be an easy journey. There will be teenage reminiscence, romantic nostalgia, striking reminders... if nothing else, let this love letter of a documentary be the (melancholic) evidence that we stand firm witness to those who made our life better."

Aotearoa/New Zealand film writer Graeme Tuckett, writing in The Post, described it as (a) "terrific, heartfelt and necessary film... A wonderful piece of work ...for anyone who needs to see how layered and nuanced an unadorned and chronological film can still be, this is an object lesson. Very recommended."
