= Love in Bright Landscapes =

Love In Bright Landscapes

Compilation album by The Triffids
- Released: 1986
- Recorded: various
- Genre: Rock, folk rock
- Label: White/Mushroom, Hot
- Producer: The Triffids

The Triffids chronology
Treeless Plain (1986)	Love In Bright Landscapes (1986)	Born Sandy Devotional (1986)

Love In Bright Landscapes is an anthology by Australian folk rock group, The Triffids, which was released in 1986. The original LP had ten tracks compiled from their album, EP and single releases in the period from 1983 to 1985, during which time the group were resident in Perth, Sydney and London. Three additional tracks from the same sources were included on the later CD version of the album.

All the tracks were written by lead singer and rhythm guitarist, David McComb; with the exception of "Raining Pleasure" which was co-written with James Paterson, and "You Don't Miss Your Water" which was written by William Bell. All tracks were arranged and produced by The Triffids. The album was first released in 1986 by Hot Records, and by White Records Label a subsidiary of Mushroom Records. Track 4, "Hell of a Summer", is misspelt on the vinyl LP version as "Hello of a Summer".

In January 2008 filming of The Triffids reunion concert at the Sydney Festival for a biopic occurred. In early 2009 Danielle Karalus, film producer and director, and Jonathan Alley, radio station 3RRR broadcaster, proposed a documentary film, Love in Bright Landscapes: The Story of David McComb of The Triffids, which was in development after the tenth anniversary of David McComb's death.

Alley, as a co-producer of the project, organised a tribute show, Deep in a Dream: An Evening with the Songs of David McComb, which was recorded and issued on CD later in 2009 to raise funds for the film. Performers at the gig, held at the Corner Hotel in Melbourne, included an expanded version of The Blackeyed Susans, another band founded by David McComb, which were assisted by former The Triffids' members Graham Lee and Robert McComb.

Love in Bright Landscapes: The Story of David McComb of The Triffids, premiered at the Melbourne International Film Festival on 13 August 2021, with its first cinema release on 9 September in Perth.

== Track listing ==
1. "You Don't Miss Your Water ('Till Your Well Runs Dry)" - 2:52 (originally appeared as a single, August 1985)
2. "Red Pony" - 4:10 (from the album, Treeless Plain, November 1983)
3. "Raining Pleasure" - 2:31 (from the EP, Raining Pleasure, June 1984)
4. "Hell Of A Summer" - 4:30 (from the album, Treeless Plain, November 1983)
5. "Jesus Calling" - 3:41 (from the EP, Raining Pleasure, June 1984)
6. "Bright Lights, Big City" - 3:33 (from the EP Field Of Glass, February, 1985)
7. "Rosevel" - 3:00 (from the album Treeless Plain, November, 1983)
8. "Property Is Condemned" - 2:57 (from the EP Raining Pleasure, June 1984)
9. "My Baby Thinks She's A Train" - 3:35 (from the album, Treeless Plain, November 1983)
10. "Monkey On My Back" - 3:41 (from the EP Field Of Glass, February, 1985)
11. "Embedded" - 3:55 (from the EP, Raining Pleasure, June 1984)
12. "Old Ghostrider" - 3:08 (from the album, Treeless Plain, November 1983)
13. "Madeline" - 2:33 (from the album, Treeless Plain, November 1983)

The original vinyl edition of the album excludes the last three tracks.

== Personnel ==
- David McComb - vocals, guitar
- 'Evil' Graham Lee - pedal steel guitar
- Martyn Casey - bass guitar
- Jill Birt - vocals, keyboards
- Robert McComb - violin, guitar
- Alsy MacDonald - drums
