= Peel Sessions (The Triffids album) =

EP by The Triffids
- Released: 1987
- Recorded: 5 May 1985
- Genre: Rock, folk rock
- Label: Strange Fruit
- Producer: Dale Griffin

The Triffids chronology
Field of Glass (1985)	Peel Sessions (1987)

Peel Sessions was recorded by Australian folk rock group The Triffids for The John Peel Show on BBC Radio 1. The three tracks were first transmitted on 14 May 1985. The 12" EP of the recordings was not released until 1987. The EP was issued in a "Special Metallic Finish Limited Edition" sleeve.

== Track listing ==
1. "Life of Crime"
2. "Chicken Killer"
3. "Lonely Stretch"

== Personnel ==
=== The Triffids ===
Credited to:

- David McComb - vocals, guitar
- Robert McComb - guitar
- Graham Lee - steel guitar
- Alsy MacDonald - drums
- Martyn Casey - bass
- Jill Birt - keyboard

=== Additional musicians ===
- Fiona Franklyn - backing vocals
- Sally Collins - backing vocals
