= Stockholm (The Triffids album) =

Live album by The Triffids
- Released: July 1990
- Recorded: 1989
- Genre: Rock, folk rock
- Label: Island
- Producer: Lars Aldman

The Triffids chronology
The Black Swan (1989)	Stockholm (1990)	Australian Melodrama (1994)

Stockholm is a live recording by Australian rock group, The Triffids, released in July 1990 and is the final official recording by the band. All tracks were recorded live in Stockholm in 1989 for Swedish National Radio, The Bommen Show. The album was produced by Lars Aldman, engineered by Michael Bergek, and mixed at Planet Sound Studios, Perth on 15, 16 and 17 September 1989 by James Hewgill and David McComb.

The album was released after the Triffids officially disbanded in August, 1989 in order to fulfill the band's contractual obligations with MNW. Island were not happy with the band using any material previously released under the label (i.e. Calenture or The Black Swan) as a result the recordings highlight the Triffids’ pre-Calenture era.

== Details ==
"Evil" Graham Lee said, "We owed our Swedish label an album, and we knew people in Swedish radio who suggested that in the middle of our tour we pop into their complex in Stockholm and make an album. So we did. It was recorded in one day. We were so tired that we were delirious, but it turned out pretty well." The audience sounds were dubbed in.

== Reception ==
Ross Clelland at Juke said, "What had me waiting for this to arrive is are the songs herein contained which we Triffophiles have drooled over live but have not been previously assigned to vinyl. Among these are Kurt Weill's "Sure the Girl I Love", and the song worth the price of admission alone, the truly special "How Could I Help But Love You", which McComb often introduces as the most beautiful song ever written."

== Track listing ==
1. "Property Is Condemned"
2. "Hell of a Summer"
3. "Personal Things"
4. "Raining Pleasure"
5. "Lonely Stretch"
6. "Sure the Girl I Love"
7. "Wide Open Road"
8. "Keep Your Eyes on the Hole"
9. "In the Pines"
10. "Billy"
11. "I Am a Lonesome Hobo"
12. "How Could I Help But Love You"

== Personnel ==
- David McComb - lead vocals, guitar
- Alsy MacDonald - drums, vocals
- Martyn P. Casey - bass
- Jill Birt - keyboards, vocals & lead vocals on "Raining Pleasure"
- Robert McComb - guitar, violin
- 'Evil' Graham Lee - guitar, vocals, pedal steel
