= Raining Pleasure (EP) =

EP by The Triffids
- Released: 1984
- Recorded: April/May 1984; A.T.A. Studios
- Genres: Rock, folk rock
- Label: Hot Records
- Producers: Nick Mainsbridge, The Triffids

The Triffids chronology
Treeless Plain (1983)	Raining Pleasure (1984)	Lawson Square Infirmary (1984)

Raining Pleasure is a record released in 1984 by the Australian folk rock group The Triffids as a 12" vinyl EP. It reached No. 95 on the Australian Charts. Its seven tracks were co-produced by the group with Nick Mainsbridge who also supplied trumpet.

Although the EP has not been in print for some time, selected tracks appeared on the Love in Bright Landscapes (1986) and Australian Melodrama (1994) compilations, while all seven tracks were compiled on Beautiful Waste and Other Songs in 2008.

== Further details ==
McComb said of the recording, "All of these songs are hysterical exercises to try and deceive people into thinking that the narrator is feeling one way, when it can be a damning indictment of the narrator of the song. He's the person mouthing off, covering up this great big hole. Mr. Butcher it was who said 'bluster emptily', which is the feeling of someone trying to hide an enormous wound by an enormous amount of words."

In 1992 the Greek indie band Rest in Peace changed their name to Raining Pleasure as a reference to the record's title track. The song "Raining Pleasure" was covered by the Australian band The Paradise Motel on their 1996 EP Some Deaths Take Forever – the track is mostly a heavily processed instrumental with few recognisable vocal fragments. During 2007 Paul Kelly performed the track as a duet with his support act New Buffalo (a.k.a. Sally Seltmann) on his Stolen Apples Tour of Australia. They recorded a live version on 20 September for Kelly's DVD, Live Apples (April 2008).

== Reception ==
Mat Snow of the New Musical Express said of the EP in 1985, "Check out the mock-Christian celibacy of "Jesus Calling", or the loathing that spews out in "Property Is Condemned", The Triffids most viciously compelling song, both off '84's excellent Raining Pleasure mini-LP."

== Track listing ==
All songs written by David McComb, unless otherwise noted.

1. "Jesus Calling"
2. "Embedded"
3. "St. James Infirmary" (trad. arr.)
4. "Everybody Has to Eat" (David McComb, James Paterson)
5. "Ballad of Jack Frost"
6. "Property is Condemned"
7. "Raining Pleasure" (David McComb, James Paterson)

== Personnel ==
=== The Triffids ===
Credited to:

- David McComb - lead vocals, guitar, piano
- Robert McComb - violin, guitar, percussion, vocals
- Alsy MacDonald - drums, tympani, congas, vocals
- Martyn Casey - bass
- Jill Birt - keyboard, vocals, lead vocals on "Raining Pleasure"

=== Additional musicians ===
- John Sandow - piano
- Neil Sanderson - viola
- Michael "Blue" Dalton of The Lighthouse Keepers - harmonica
- Margaret Labi - backing vocals
- Melanie Oxley - backing vocals
- Nick Mainsbridge - trumpet
