= Field of Glass =

Field Of Glass

EP by The Triffids
- Released: February 1985
- Recorded: BBC Studio 5, Maida Vale, London; November 6, 1984
- Genre: Rock / Folk rock
- Label: Hot Records
- Producer: Mark Radcliffe

The Triffids chronology
Lawson Square Infirmary (1985)	Field Of Glass (1985)	Peel Sessions (1987)

Field Of Glass by The Triffids was released as a 12" extended play in 1985. All three tracks were generally recorded live at BBC Studio 5, Maida Vale, London. The EP was produced by Mark Radcliffe, engineered by Mike Robinson, engineered by Owen Davies and remixed by Nick Cook at Townhouse 3.

== Details ==
The first two songs, "Bright Lights, Big City" and "Monkey On My Back", deal directly with David McComb’s drug abuse and are infused with bitterness and desperation. The song which gave its name to the EP was originally two songs – "Field of Glass" and "Pleasure Slide". McComb said the song had an "abandoned narrative. It was based around some suburban boy and his fantasies, and the gap between his fantasies and the mundane realities of his girlfriend and his girlfriend's dog and parents and things like that."

McComb later said, "When we got to London I think we sort of felt we had to make a kind of statement. We recorded the Field of Glass EP just when we got there, which is still I guess the most aggressive and violent record that we had done. It gave us heaps of confidence."

"Evil" Graham Lee noted the EP was, "a psychodrama from beginning to end, with a ferocious, partly improvised maelstrom of a sound to match the tortured, twisted and sometimes very funny lyrics. Nothing The Triffids had done to this point could have prepared listeners for the onslaught of Field Of Glass."

== Track listing ==
All tracks written by David McComb.

1. "Bright Lights, Big City"
2. "Monkey on My Back"
3. "Field of Glass"

== Personnel ==
=== The Triffids ===
Credited to:

- David McComb – vocals, guitar
- Robert McComb – guitar, percussion, vocals
- Alsy MacDonald – drums, vocals
- Martyn Casey (a.k.a. Daubney Carshott) – bass
- Jill Birt – keyboard
