= Love of Will =

Studio album by David McComb
- Released: March 1994
- Recorded: June – August, 1993 at Platinum Studios - Melbourne, Australia
- Genre: Rock, folk rock
- Length: 55:15
- Label: White Label Records (Mushroom Records)
- Producer: Nick Mainsbridge

Love of Will is the only studio album by David McComb, released in March 1994. The album was recorded and mixed between June and August 1993, at Platinum Studios with additional mixing at Metropolis and Sing Sing Studios. McComb selected 13 songs out of a pile of 35 and recorded them at Platinum Studios, Melbourne with producer Nick Mainsbridge, together with freelance musical directors Graham Lee and David McComb, and assistant engineers Kalju Tonuma and Phil Jones.

Videos were made for the singles from the album, "Setting You Free" and "Clear Out My Mind".

== Details ==
The album was being planned for a period of four and a half years, with McComb waiting for all the members of the band, who also played with Nick Cave and the Bad Seeds and The Blackeyed Susans, to be available to tour before releasing the album. He also said, "I wanted to be certain that every song was right. I'm not obsessed with longevity, but a song has to last a few years. There's no point doing something that'll only last a few months. The criterion is for the songs to be as powerful as they can be."

Triffids drummer Alsy MacDonald said, "I think those songs were specifically designed to be recorded not by the Triffids. And Dave was less worried about atmospherics — it's a rootsier album." "Evil" Graham Lee added, "the songs that the Triffids could have done, we wouldn't have played like that. It's a straightforward band record."

== Reception ==
Reviewed in Rolling Stone Australia at the time of release, it was given a rating of three and a half from a possible five. McComb's first solo release is described as, "worth hanging around for." The review states the best moments, "are in its quieter gospel-inflected songs, such as the beautiful, textured, "Leaning"." Producer Nick Mainsbridge is said to have, "eschewed even the pretence of studio trickery."

Juice gave the album the same rating, but said the album, "often sounds amateurish. There has always been a sense with McComb that he is a non-musician who has somehow managed to make decent music." It concluded that the album would please, "critics and Triffids fans."

== Track listing ==
All tracks written by David McComb unless otherwise noted.

1. "Clear Out My Mind" - 3:57
2. "Setting You Free" - 4:04
3. "Day of My Ascension" - 3:24
4. "Deep in a Dream" - 5:42
5. "Nothing Good" (David McComb, Will Akers) - 4:19
6. "The Lord Burns Every Clue" (David McComb, Will Akers) - 2:35
7. "Lifelike" - 4:12
8. "Lover Sister #1" (David McComb, Graham Lee) - 3:40
9. "Heard You Had a Bed" - 4:25
10. "Inside of Me" - 4:26
11. "Leaning" (David McComb, Will Akers) - 4:52
12. "I Want To Conquer You" (David McComb, Adam Peters) - 6:01
13. "Pack Up Your Troubles" - 3:35

== Personnel ==
- David McComb - lead vocals, guitar, keyboards
- Martyn P. Casey - bass
- Peter Luscombe - drums, percussion
- Bruce Haymes - piano, organ
- 'Evil' Graham Lee - guitar, vocals, pedal steel, lap steel
- Daniel Denholm - Fairlight programming and string arrangements.
- Warren Lee Ellis - violin
- Barry Palmer - guitar
- Phil Kakulas - double bass
- Rob McComb - whistling
- Lisa Miller - backing vocals
- Joanne Alach - backing vocals
- Rob Snarski - backing vocals
