= Trick of the Light (The Triffids song) =

Single by The Triffids

from the album Calenture
- A-side: "Trick of the Light"
- B-side: "Love the Fever"
- Released: January 1988
- Recorded: April–August 1987
- Length: 8:31
- Label: Island
- Songwriter: David McComb
- Producers: Gil Norton; Adam Peters

The Triffids singles chronology
"Bury Me Deep in Love" (1987)	"Trick of the Light" (1988)	"Holy Water" (1988)

"Trick of the Light" is a single released in January 1988 by Australian group The Triffids from their album Calenture (November 1987). The single appeared in 7", 10", 12" and CD single versions. It was produced by Gil Norton (Pixies, Echo & the Bunnymen, Foo Fighters) and written by David McComb. The B-Side "Love the Fever" was co-written by David McComb and Adam Peters and was produced by Peters (Family of God, The Flowerpot Men, Neulander, Sunsonic). It was recorded in August 1986.

"Trick of the Light" was the band's second United Kingdom hit reaching No. 73 on the UK singles chart in February 1988; and reached No. 77 on the Australian Kent Music Report Singles Chart.

McComb said the song was, "Written one morning in the company of Bleddyn Butcher, in the woolshed where In The Pines was recorded, while waiting for the band to arrive. I can't for the life of me think what it's about. If anyone wants to know the juicy personal details that inspired these songs, please write to Mr Toby Creswell. He has a much better memory for these things than I."

== Track listing ==
1. "Trick of the Light" - 3:50
2. "Love the Fever" - 4:41
3. "Everything You Touch Turns to Time" (12", CD) - 3:16
4. "Bad News Always Reminds Me of You" (10",12", CD) - 3:25

== Personnel ==
- David McComb
- Alsy MacDonald
- Robert McComb
- Martyn P. Casey
- Jill Birt
- Graham Lee
- Adam Peters
