= Goodbye Little Boy =

Single by The Triffids

from the album The Black Swan
- B-side: "Go Home Eddie"
- Released: March 1989
- Recorded: September–October 1988
- Label: White Hot; Island
- Songwriter(s): David McComb
- Producer(s): Stephen Street

The Triffids singles chronology
"Holy Water" (1988)	"Goodbye Little Boy" (1989)	"Falling Over You" (1989)

"Goodbye Little Boy" was the first single released in March 1989 by Australian group The Triffids ahead of their album The Black Swan. Lead vocals are provided by Jill Birt, their keyboardist, instead of David McComb, the group's usual lead singer. Birt is also featured on the single's front cover.

"Goodbye Little Boy" was produced by Stephen Street (The Smiths, Morrissey), and co-written by McComb and Adam Peters. The B-Side "Go Home Eddie" was written by McComb and produced by Street. The songs were recorded between September and October 1988 at The Justice Room, Cathanger, Somerset. "Shell of the Man" was written and produced by McComb. The single was released as a 7", 10", 12" and CD single versions.

The track reached No. 81 on the Australian Kent Music Report Singles Chart in April 1989.

== Track listing ==
1. "Goodbye Little Boy" – 3:25
2. "Go Home Eddie" – 2:36
3. "Shell of the Man" – 3:57 (10", 12", CD)
4. "You Minus Me" – 2:38 (CD)

== Personnel ==
- Jill Birt – vocals, keyboards
- David McComb – acoustic guitar
- Alsy MacDonald – drum programming
- Robert McComb – electric guitar
- Graham Lee – lap steel
- Martyn P. Casey – bass
- Adam Peters
