= The Cliffe =

House in Peppermint Grove, Western Australia

Coordinates: 31.9937°S 115.7713°E

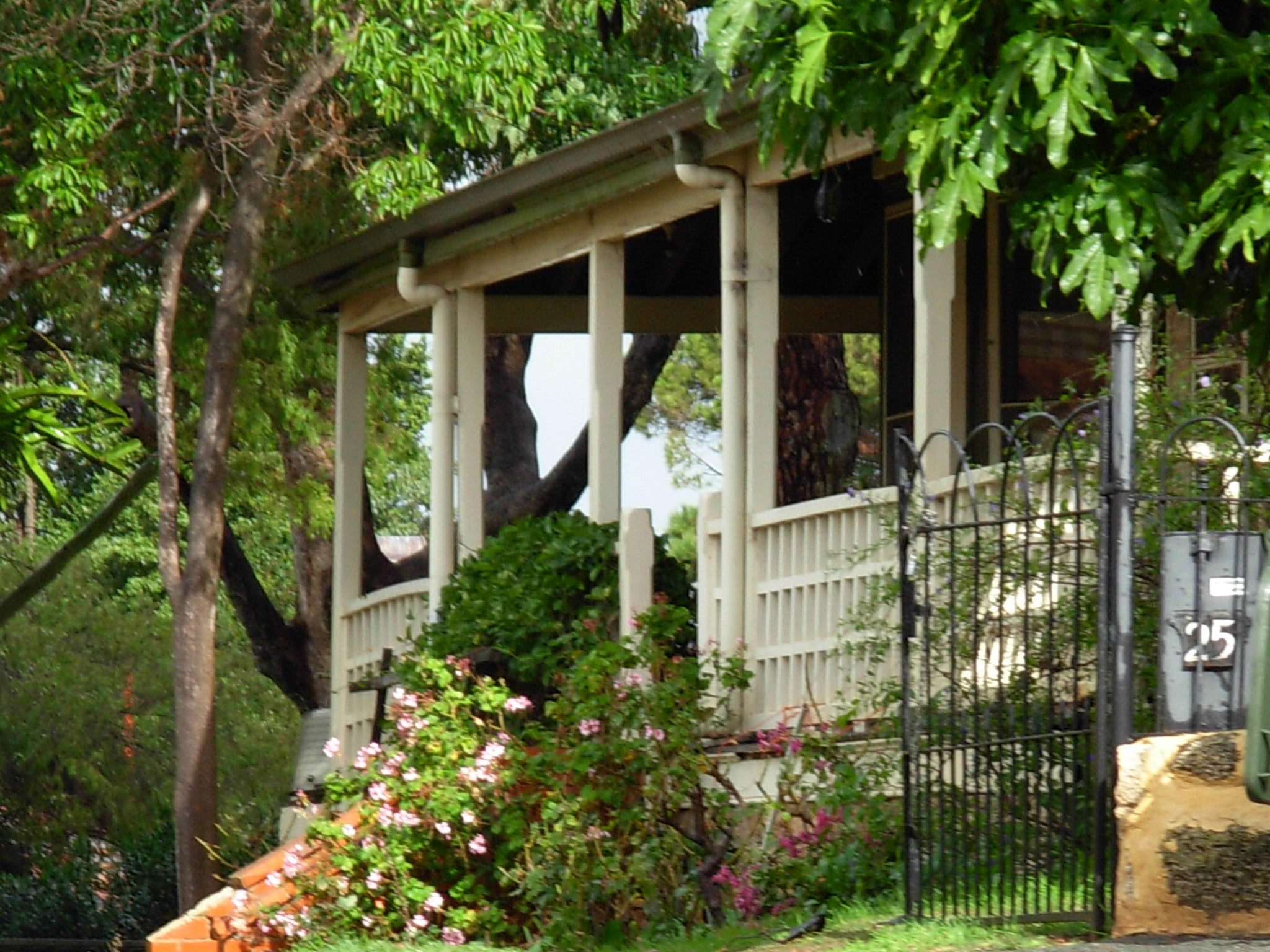
- The Cliffe east verandah from the road

General information
- Location: 25 Bindaring Parade, Australia

Design and construction
- Architect: Clarence Wilkinson

Western Australia Heritage Register
- Type: Shire of Peppermint Grove Municipal Inventory
- Designated: 19 July 1998
- Reference no.: 1924

Western Australia Heritage Register
- Type: State Register of Heritage Places
- Delisted: 22 August 2008

The Cliffe is one of the first residential dwellings built in the Perth suburb of Peppermint Grove.

The house is located at 25 Bindaring Parade, Peppermint Grove and has historical associations with the prominent McNeil, Brisbane and McComb families.

== Description ==
The original house was designed by architect Clarence Wilkinson and built in 1894 for businessman and timber merchant Neil McNeil. Substantive additions, undertaken in 1899, were designed by prominent Western Australian architect J. Talbot Hobbs. Later additional and modifications to the house occurred in the 1930s and the 1960s when the northern wing, previously servants quarters were refurbished.

The dwelling is designed in the Federation Bungalow style and built predominantly of jarrah. In 1914, James Battye in his Cyclopedia of Western Australia described the dwelling as follows:

From the substantial foundation to the shingle roof every part of the structure is of jarrah, and after nearly twenty years - the house having been built in 1894 – every plank and beam and joist remain in as sound condition as when first they were cut to the contractor's design. Over twenty rooms are roofed beneath these jarrah shingles, and the interior is fitted up with all that art and comfort can suggest, while surrounding the house is a park of ten acres, tastefully laid out with lawns and flower-beds, and further beautified by the introduction of decorative statuary in bronze, collected by Mr McNeil on various trips to England and the Continent.

== History ==
The Cliffe was built in 1894/95 by Neil McNeil on 4 hectares (10 acres) of land he had purchased in 1892 – one year after Peppermint Grove was surveyed into building allotments. McNeil was one of the first five landowners in the area and his name was given to McNeil Street which ran along the southern border of his property from the Swan River to what is now Stirling Highway. McNeil was one of the owners of the Jarrahdale Timber Company which exported timber for the paving of London Streets at the turn of the century. Because of his strong business interest in timber and his conviction of its suitability as a building material, McNeil built his home as a showpiece of jarrah construction. Unfortunately, McNeil's vision of majestic timber houses, rather than houses constructed of brick and stone, was not shared by the Peppermint Grove Road Board which later legislated against timber construction in the area.

The original house was designed by Clarence Wilkinson. The house was altered and extended in coming years, most notably the additional of a billiard room and other rooms in 1896 by Wilkinson and Smith and, following McNeil's marriage in 1900 to Jessie Alexander Lawrie, some further modifications in 1906 designed by the architect J.Talbot Hobbs and his firm, Hobbs Smith and Forbes.

In 1915 the property was subdivided into 20 lots with the Cliffe retaining a considerable curtilage on the banks of the Swan River.

The property was sold in 1927, following McNeil's death, to Lance Brisbane, a prominent West Australian industrialist. When Lance Brisbane moved in 1933, Brisbane's brother, David Brisbane, and his family, occupied The Cliffe until his death in 1960.

Harold McComb, a plastic surgeon and Athel Hockey, a geneticist, subsequently purchased the Cliffe and lived there until April 1995. The McComb's had four sons, two of whom (David and Robert) performed in the iconic Australian alternative rock band, The Triffids. According to rock historian, Bleddyn Butcher,

Between 1978 and 1981, the Triffids recorded six collections of original songs at The Cliffe. The house remained a sanctuary and source of inspiration throughout their career. Its peculiar location, an eyrie on Devil's Elbow overlooking Freshwater Bay, gave David a startling perspective as well as a beautiful view. When he became interested as a teenager in forming a band, he and the future Triffids would gather in the cellar at The Cliffe to practise, the size of the grounds ensuring there were few neighbours to disturb.

According to Robert McComb, the home inspired his famous brother, who loved the house:

The house was the home of the band while we were in Perth. The sprawling rooms, lofts and underground cellars we used to rehearse in were things most Perth houses didn't have; there was such a strong atmosphere there that Dave would return to it for inspiration.

The cover of The Triffids' last album, The Black Swan (1989) was photographed in the stables at the rear of the house during the summer of 1988/1989.

In April 1995, the McCombs sold the house to a local real estate agent, Christopher Shellabear: "Our family all left home and my wife and I were rattling around in this huge house", Harold McComb explained. On 30 June 1995, following receipt of petition from local residents worried about the potential redevelopment of the site, the Heritage Council of Western Australia issued a Stop Work (or Conservation) order under Section 59 of the Heritage of Western Australia Act 1990. On 17 July 1995, Chris Shellabear sold the now-encumbered property to Sharon Creasy, wife of prospector Mark Creasy, for $2.7 million. On 10 October 1995, the Heritage Council of Western Australia added the property to the State Register of Heritage Places on an "interim" basis. The Creasys contested the interim listing for nine years, and in 2004 the Heritage Council removed the dwelling from the interim listing and placed it on the permanent register. There was a legal dispute as to whether the listing was done correctly, resulting in the Heritage Council re-registering it on the permanent list in May 2005. The Creasys estimate that the dispute has cost them $225,000 in legal fees and claim that the house is now uninhabitable, estimating it would cost at least $2.8 million to make it liveable and much more to renovate it completely.

The dwelling is registered on the Shire of Peppermint Grove's Municipal Inventory, and with the National Trust on 6 March 1984, the Register of the National Estate on 30 June 1992, and the State Register of Heritage Places (original interim listing on 10 October 1995 and permanent listing on 27 February 2004). It was then removed from the State Register on 6 July 2004, with a second interim listing on 20 July 2004 and obtaining a permanent listing on 19 July 2005.

According to the Heritage Council of Western Australia's assessment "The Cliffe is a rare example in metropolitan Perth of a substantial weatherboard 'gentleman's' residence, which has, intact, the subsidiary buildings of coachhouse, stables, summerhouse, servants cottages, and part of the original gardens."

On Thursday 5 June 2008 the Legislative Council supported Parliament's first de-listing of an order by the Heritage Council so that the house could be demolished on the basis that the Government was potentially exposed to a $20 million lawsuit under clause 76 of the 1990 State Heritage Act. The clause, which had never previously been used, allows owners of heritage-listed properties to ask the Government to buy their property if its heritage listing makes it "incapable of reasonably beneficial use, and that the carrying out of any reasonable development could not render the land capable of reasonably beneficial use". The property was subsequently removed from the State Register of Heritage Places on 22 August 2008. Section 55 of the Act precludes consideration for re-entry onto the Register for a period of five years from the date of its removal, except with leave of the Supreme Court.

In a newspaper interview, Robert McComb denied claims by Mr Creasy and both sides of parliament that the house was derelict.

In 1998 I took my son around to show him the house. I remember showing him the quality of workmanship, how the doors still fitted millimetre-perfect after 100 years, how the solid jarrah shingles, stained glass and beautiful dark floorboards were still in perfect condition. We lived in it up until the time we sold it and it was fine.

— Robert McComb

In an interview with Drum Media, Jill Birt (keyboardist with The Triffids and qualified architect) advised

[...] the significance of that house is that it was built as a display home for the use of jarrah timber by a timber merchant, so it's the biggest jarrah house ever built. Thrown into the pot is the fact that Dave [David McComb] happened to live there and he has been writing there since he was old enough to write. Certainly in his late primary school years and his high school years and the years when the Triffids started forming he wrote a lot of short stories, poetry, and obviously songs and the house is clearly the backdrop to this material. even in later songs it's there and remembered in that respect.

— Jill Birt

She went on to express her disdain for Western Australia's tendency to forget about heritage and culture.

When we were in Europe, we were invited to London for the unveiling of a plaque on a building with The Triffids name on it - on the building where we recorded our album Born Sandy Devotional. That building was in quite a derelict part of town. This council put a plaque up on a building where we recorded, so I find it's kind of odd that the Peppermint Grove council now doesn't think that the very house where the band started out is not worth saving.

— Jill Birt

In October 2008, the Shire of Peppermint Grove approved the demolition of the building, although the Shire President did indicate that there was a desire among his fellow councillors to see at least the main rooms of The Cliffe relocated to a local park.

We need to investigate the costs of relocating and ask the community for its point of view but I personally believe it's a valuable building and worth saving.

— Brian Kavanagh

The process of the removal from the heritage list occurred resurfaced from a complaint to the West Australian Corruption and Crime Commission in July 2009 with the main parties named denying any conspiracy.

== Present status ==
The property was purchased by a private Perth businesswoman in 2013, who saved it from demolition. The owner purchased substantial land around The Cliffe in 2022 to re-instate its parklands.
