= Wide Open Road (The Triffids song) =

Single by The Triffids

from the album Born Sandy Devotional
- B-side: "Time of Weakness"
- Released: February 1986
- Recorded: August 1985 Mark Angelo Studios, London
- Genre: Indie rock, folk rock
- Length: 4:08
- Label: White Hot / Mushroom; Domino Records
- Songwriter: David McComb
- Producer: Gil Norton

The Triffids singles chronology
"You Don't Miss Your Water" (1985)	"Wide Open Road" (1986)	"Bury Me Deep in Love" (1987)

"Wide Open Road" CD Single Cover
- Domino Records cover for 2006 promo CD

"Wide Open Road" is a single released in 1986 by Australian rock band The Triffids from their album Born Sandy Devotional. It was produced by Gil Norton (Pixies, Echo & the Bunnymen, Foo Fighters) and written by David McComb on vocals, keyboards and guitar. The B-side "Time of Weakness" was recorded live at the Graphic Arts Club, Sydney, November 1985 by Mitch Jones, mixed by Rob Muir (in Perth). "Dear Miss Lonely Hearts" was recorded at Planet Sound Studios, Perth and produced by the Triffids. "Wide Open Road" reached No. 26 on the UK Singles Chart in 1986, and No. 64 on the Australian Kent Music Report Singles Chart. In May 2001 the Australasian Performing Right Association (APRA), as part of its 75th Anniversary celebrations, named "Wide Open Road" as one of the Top 30 Australian songs of all time.

In January 2018, as part of Triple M's "Ozzest 100", the 'most Australian' songs of all time, "Wide Open Road" was ranked number 64.

== Background ==
The Triffids had toured Europe in 1985 and were based in London but they were unable to raise a major record deal and with a lack of finances, their second studio album Born Sandy Devotional was recorded there in August 1985 with Gil Norton producing (fresh from working with Echo & the Bunnymen). They released two versions of "Wide Open Road", a 7” version and a 12” version. The B-side, "Time of Weakness", was recorded live at the Graphic Arts Club, Sydney. The album reached No. 27 on the UK charts and the single peaked at No. 26 on the UK charts: while only reaching No. 64 on the Australian Kent Music Report Singles Chart. The song was written by David McComb, who described the process:

I started the song at Julian Wu's house in Melbourne. Ah, the end of a beautiful era [...] One morning I sat bolt upright in bed and virtually all the lyrics appeared instantly. I just tried to keep it as blunt and direct as possible, even if the results made myself or the listener squirm [...] I finished the music at a sound-check somewhere in Europe. Like the rest of the Born Sandy Devotional album, it seemed to naturally evoke a particular landscape, namely the stretch of highway in between Caiguna and Norseman, where the Triffids' Hi-Ace monotonously came to grief with kangaroos.

— David McComb

It was really just another wonderful song from Dave's pen to us. It's never been performed by anyone else with any degree of success in my mind because it's a simple song recorded with extreme dynamic subtlety. Every piece has its place from the softly swooshing drum machine beat to the insistent bass line that doesn't always follow the chords - a true McComb/Casey trademark - to the several melodies that act as counterpoint to the vocal.

— Graham Lee

This song has a specific meaning, a specific narrative and at the same time a universal story. It could be set, if you think about it, anywhere. The sound was built up to satisfy his vision for his songs. Atmosphere, mystery, the extraordinary, complete lack of cliché, originality. Along the way, a sound was heard that could be construed to be quintessentially Australian. I don't think Dave tried to forge an Australian sound at all. I'm not trying to portray him as a puppeteer here -- all band members brought something special to the mix, but Dave had, more than most (in any band), a sound in his head that he tried his best to replicate on two-inch tape. A very different sound but very like Brian Wilson in his drive and vision (though Brian Wilson couldn't write great lyrics).

— Graham Lee

On 10 January 1987 The Triffids performed the track live at their home town, Perth's Subiaco Oval, as part of the Australian Made Tour by various artists. McComb introduced their performance: "... it's sorta hard to write the set list at the start of the day 'cos we've had so many hits in this country: it's difficult to know which hit to play. Where to start? But this one's been played on Countdown so I guess that means something..." In July that year a documentary film, Australian Made: The Movie, of the concert series, with The Triffids represented by "Wide Open Road", was released to Australian cinemas and later onto VHS (1988).

The song reached No. 68 on Triple J's Hottest 100 for 1989 and No. 49 in 1990 (from 1989 to 1991, voting was not restricted to songs released that year). Its success also resulted in the band's first appearance on Australia's popular weekly musical television show, Countdown.

== Reviews ==
"Hauntingly simple in its sparse use of keyboards, clean, ringing guitars, and just the one, repeated drum fill, it has an epic majesty which is entirely suited to the semi-mythical Australia of The Triffids’ vision; no other song has so perfectly captured the sense of vast, uncharted expanses which characterises the Australia of our collective imagination."

"'Wide Open Road' is one of those songs that illustrates the stark reality of Australia’s barren, desolate landscape on many levels, emphasising it's often cruel geography and the realities that come from existing within it."

"The band uses silence and space to allow the lyrics and melody to resonate fully with the listener. While the song may be Australian in setting with its evocation of a vast, desert wasteland, it uses the Australian desert as a metaphor for the distance between people and for the sense of loss following a failed relationship."

== Legacy ==
In May 2001 the Australasian Performing Right Association (APRA), as part of its 75th Anniversary celebrations, named "Wide Open Road" as one of the Top 30 Australian songs of all time.

Paul Kelly and The Saints' Chris Bailey performed "Wide Open Road" at the Mushroom 25th Anniversary concert in 1998, to ensure that one of Kelly's favourite songwriters was represented.

"Wide Open Road" was re-released as a CD single by Mushroom Records in 1998 as No. 16 in a series of 25 limited edition classic Mushroom singles. It was also re-released as a download only single by Domino Records to coincide with the re-release of Born Sandy Devotional in July 2006.

Cover versions of the song were also recorded by Weddings Parties Anything on their 1998 compilation album Trophy Night, and The Church on their 2007 acoustic album El Momento Siguiente. It was also covered by fellow Perth outfit The Panics for Triple J's segment, "Like a Version" in 2007.

At the band's induction into the ARIA Hall of Fame in July 2008, Steve Kilbey from The Church filled in for David McComb when The Triffids performed "Wide Open Road".

It's nerve-wracking, it's a huge song. It's like singing (Led Zeppelin's) "Whole Lotta Love" - everybody knows it and loves it. The moment I heard it I wished I'd written it, and after all this time through very unfortunate circumstances the dream (to perform it) has come true.

— Steve Kilbey

Missy Higgins performed "Wide Open Road" at the Mushroom 50th Anniversary concert in 2023.

== Track listing ==
All tracks written by David McComb.

=== Original release (7") ===
1. "Wide Open Road" - 4:08
2. "Time of Weakness" - 3:12

=== Original release (12") ===
1. "Wide Open Road" - 4:08
2. "Time of Weakness" (live) - 3:12
3. "Dear Miss Lonely Hearts"
4. "Native Bride" (live)

=== 1989 Mushroom Records re-release ===
1. "Wide Open Road"
2. "Time of Weakness"

== Personnel ==
The Triffids members

- Jill Birt — keyboards (track 1), hammond organ (track 3)
- Martyn P. Casey — bass (all tracks)
- Graham Lee — pedal steel guitar (track 1), lap steel guitar (track 2, 4)
- Alsy MacDonald — drums (track 1, 3), hi-hat (track 2, 4)
- David McComb — vocals (all tracks), guitar (all tracks), keyboards (track 1)
- Robert McComb — guitar (all tracks), violin (track 3)

Additional musicians

- Adam Peters — piano, keyboards

Recording details

- Producer — Gil Norton
- Sequencer — MacDonald, (track 1), D McComb (track 1)
- Mixer — Rob Muir (track 2)
- Recording — Mitch Jones (track 2, live)
- Studio — Mark Angelo Studios, London (track 1), The Graphics Art Club, Sydney (track 2)
  - Mixing studio — Amazon Studios, Liverpool (track 1)

Art work

- Photography — Bleddyn Butcher (front cover), MacDonald (back cover), Mark Trengove (Domino 2006)
