= Bury Me Deep in Love =

Single by The Triffids

from the album Calenture
- B-side: "Baby Can I Walk You Home"
- Released: October 1987
- Recorded: April–August 1986, Mark Angelo Studios, London
- Genre: Indie rock, Folk rock
- Length: 4:04
- Label: White Label; Island
- Songwriter: David McComb
- Producers: Gil Norton; Victor Van Vugt

The Triffids singles chronology
"Wide Open Road" (1987)	"Bury Me Deep in Love" (1987)	"Trick of the Light" (1988)

"Bury Me Deep in Love" Alternative Cover
- 1989 UK (Island Records) cover

Bury Me Deep in Love is a single released by Australian rock group The Triffids from their album Calenture. It appeared in October 1987 and reached No. 48 on the Australian Kent Music Report Singles Chart. It was produced by Gil Norton (Pixies, Echo & the Bunnymen, Foo Fighters) and written by David McComb, the group's lead singer and guitarist. The B-sides "Baby Can I Walk You Home" and "Region Unknown" were produced by Victor Van Vugt and The Triffids. The single was released as 7", 12" & CD single versions.

"Bury Me Deep in Love" was covered by Kylie Minogue, in a duet with Jimmy Little, on the 2001 album Corroboration. It was used in the Australian TV soap Neighbours for the wedding of Harold Bishop and Madge Mitchell. The single was re-issued in the United Kingdom in August 1989 (again as a 7", 12" & CD version), with new B-sides to tie in with the local broadcast of the Neighbours 1989 episode. The new tracks were cover versions of "Rent" by Pet Shop Boys and "Into the Groove" by Madonna. It was also used in November 2009 for Australian drama series, Packed to the Rafters for the wedding of Ben and Mel.

McComb said the song, "started as a very slow groove inspired by Al Green's beautiful "Beware". Evolved into the orchestral monster on Calenture via Craig Leon's hideous mutation - which I have on tape, but which no one will ever hear. A 30,000 pound mistake."

== Track listing ==
=== Original release ===
1. "Bury Me Deep in Love" (7", 12", CD)
2. "Baby Can I Walk You Home" (7", 12", CD)
3. "Region Unknown" (12", CD)
4. "Vagabond Holes" (CD)

=== 1989 UK re-issue ===
1. "Bury Me Deep in Love" (7", 12", CD) – 4:02
2. "Rent" (7", 12", CD) – 2:43
3. "Into the Groove" (12", CD) – 4:25

== Charts ==
Chart (1988)	Peak position
Australia (Kent Music Report)	48
New Zealand (Recorded Music NZ)	34

== Personnel ==
Credited to:

- David McComb – vocals, guitar
- Alsy MacDonald – drums, vocals
- Robert McComb – guitar, vocals, violin
- Martyn P. Casey – bass
- Jill Birt – keyboards
- Graham Lee – guitar
- Adam Peters – keyboards
