= Stand Up (The Triffids song) =

Single by The Triffids
- A-side: "Stand Up"
- B-side: "Farmers Never Visit Nightclubs"
- Released: July 1981
- Recorded: February 1981; Shelter Studios, Perth, Western Australia
- Genre: Indie rock, folk rock
- Length: 4:15
- Label: Shake Some Action
- Songwriter(s): David McComb
- Producer(s): Peter Simpson

The Triffids singles chronology
| "Stand Up" (1981) | "Spanish Blue" (1982) |

"Stand Up" is the debut single released by Australian rock group, The Triffids in July 1981. The production by Peter Simpson for the Shake Some Action label was the prize for the band winning a song competition in late 1980. The competition was sponsored by the Western Australian Institute of Technology (now Curtin University) Student Guild's radio show on 6NR (now Curtin FM).

The lyrics of the chorus exemplify a tone that singer-songwriter, David McComb, would pursue throughout his work.

"...Stand up for your rights
Grab your baby and hold her tight
If she don't love you well it's OK
We're all gonna die anyway..."

McComb later said, "Most people preferred 'Farmers'. I guess people find that sort of thing zany. To this day we get people screaming out for that song when we play live."

== Track listing ==
All tracks written by David McComb.

1. "Stand Up" – 1:41
2. "Farmers Never Visit Nightclubs" – 2:34

== Personnel ==
- Robert McComb – guitar, vocals
- David McComb – lead vocals, guitar
- Will Akers – bass, vocals
- Mark Peters – drums
- Margaret Gillard – piano, organ, vocals
