= In the Pines (album) =

In The Pines

Studio album by The Triffids
- Released: August 1986
- Recorded: April 14–18, 1986
- Genre: Rock; folk rock
- Length: 34:28 / Reissue 55:40
- Label: Mushroom
- Producer: Bruce Callaway / David McComb

The Triffids chronology
| Born Sandy Devotional (1986) | In The Pines (1986) | Calenture (1987) |

In The Pines is an album by The Triffids, released in August 1986, which reached No. 69 on the Australian Album Charts.

== Recording ==
The album was produced by Bruce Callaway and David McComb, recorded in a woolshed on a remote Western Australian farming property, owned by the McCombs' parents, on an eight-track machine for a grand total of $1190; the album notes record that $340 of this was spent on alcohol (beer, wine and vodka), which exceeded the $310 spent on food, the $300 on recording equipment hire and the $240 on petrol.

"It was just an idea that had been kicking around for some time. We had some time to do it and it was something that didn’t involve a huge effort to do. If it didn’t work, it didn’t work. It didn’t matter. It was something of a holiday really. At the very least we would have had a chance to play the songs and if it didn't work out have demoed some songs for the next album. It was just something that we did and which turned out to be releasable." - Graham Lee

Alsy MacDonald later noted, "Dave had the idea for a long time of doing something in a very basic setting, with very basic equipment. Like The Basement Tapes or Music From Big Pink, where by transplanting yourself to this unique location it creates a special sound. As far as the rest of us were concerned, it wouldn't have mattered if we continued recording in London or Sydney."

As of 2010, David McComb's parents still owned the property; his ashes were scattered in the pine grove there.

== Reissue ==
The reissue by Domino Records released in February 2007 included three additional songs that had previously been held over for Calenture: "Trick Of The Light", "Blinder By The Hour" and "Jerdacuttup Man". It also included two other songs that were not on the original edition: "She's Sure The Girl I Love" and "Wish to See No More". The previous version of "Born Sandy Devotional" is expanded. The reissue was remixed by Bruce Callaway, the sound engineer of the original recordings.

== Reception ==
Professional ratings
Review scores
| Source | Rating |
|---|---|
| Allmusic | 4.5/5 stars |
| Encyclopedia of Popular Music | 3/5 stars |
| Gigwise | 8/10 stars |
| The Great Rock Discography | 8/10 |
| Ox-Fanzine | 9/10 |
| Popmatters | 8/10 |
| Record Collector | 4/5 stars |

AllMusic said, "The stripped-down, communal feel of this record beautifully captures the essence of the Triffids' folk- and country-influenced rock and underscores frontman David McComb's musical and lyrical talent for translating the isolated mental and physical landscapes of western Australia."

Mat Snow claimed it was, "probably the best Australian country and western album ever made, though the competition can hardly be called stiff."

== Track listing ==
All songs written by David McComb, unless otherwise noted.

=== Original edition ===
1. "Suntrapper" – 2:18
2. "In the Pines" – 2:35
3. "Kathy Knows" – 3:45
4. "25 To 5" – 1:06
5. "Do You Want Me Near You?" (Allan MacDonald) – 3:41
6. "Once a Day" (Bill Anderson) – 4:01
7. "Just Might Fade Away" – 2:59
8. "Better Off This Way" – 2:51
9. "Only One Life" – 1:30
10. "Keep Your Eyes on the Hole" – 2:14
11. "One Soul Less on Your Fiery List" – 4:18
12. "Born Sandy Devotional (Edit)" – 1:28
13. "Love and Affection" – 1:42

=== Remastered edition ===
1. "Suntrapper" – 2:34
2. "In the Pines" – 2:41
3. "Kathy Knows" – 4:01
4. "25 to 5" – 1:06
5. "Only One Life" – 1:39
6. "Do You Want Me Near You?" (Allan MacDonald) – 3:32
7. "Trick of the Light" (David McComb, Graham Lee) – 3:59
8. "Once a Day" (Bill Anderson) – 4:09
9. "She's Sure The Girl I Love" (Barry Mann, Cynthia Weil) – 2:24
10. "Jerdacuttup Man" (David McComb, James Paterson) – 4:51
11. "Just Might Fade Away" – 3:10
12. "Better off This Way" – 2:59
13. "Keep Your Eyes on the Hole" – 2:21
14. "Blinder by The Hour" – 2:59
15. "Wish to See No More" – 2:41
16. "One Soul Less on Your Fiery List" – 4:42
17. "Born Sandy Devotional" – 3:54
18. "Love and Affection" – 1:58

== Personnel ==
Credited to:

- David McComb – vocals, guitar, mandolin
- 'Evil' Graham Lee – acoustic guitar, pedal and lap steel guitar, backing vocals
- Martyn Casey – bass guitar
- Jill Birt – vocals, keyboards
- Robert McComb – violin, guitar, drums ("Do You Want Me Near You?), harmonica, mandolin, backing vocals
- Alsy MacDonald – drums, backing vocals

== Charts ==
Chart performance for In the Pines
| Chart (1986) | Peak position |
|---|---|
| Australian Albums (Kent Music Report) | 69 |
| Belgian Albums (Ultratop Flanders) | 78 |
