= Reverie (EP) =

EP by The Triffids
- Released: November 1982
- Recorded: Mutant Mule Studios; August 1981
- Genres: Rock; folk rock
- Label: Resonant Records
- Producer: Tim Lambert

The Triffids chronology
Reverie (1982)	Bad Timing and Other Stories (1983)

Reverie is the official debut recording by Australian alternative rock band The Triffids, released as a 7" extended play in November 1982. Its four tracks were produced by Tim Lambert for Resonant Records.

== Track listing ==
1. "Reverie"
2. "Place in the Sun"
3. "Joan of Arc"
4. "This Boy"

== Personnel ==
=== The Triffids ===
Credited to:

- David McComb - lead vocals, guitar
- Robert McComb - guitar, vocals
- Will Akers - bass, vocals
- Margaret Gillard - piano, organ, vocals
- Alsy MacDonald - drums

=== Additional musicians ===
- Mark Peters - drums
