= Spanish Blue =

Spanish Blue may refer to:

- Spanish Blue (song), a 1982 single by The Triffids
- Spanish Blue (album), a 1975 album by Ron Carter
