= The Black Swan (The Triffids album) =

Studio album by The Triffids
- Released: April 1989
- Genres: Rock; folk rock
- Length: 46:43
- Label: Island Records/Mushroom Records
- Producers: Stephen Street; The Triffids

The Triffids chronology
Calenture (1987)	The Black Swan (1989)	Stockholm (1990)

Singles from The Black Swan
- 1. "Goodbye Little Boy" Released: 1989; 2. "Falling Over You" Released: 1989

The Black Swan is the fifth and final studio album by The Triffids, released in April 1989 and peaking at No. 59 on the Australian Album Charts. The album was originally conceived as a double album.

In the recording sessions the Triffids were joined by producer Stephen Street (the Smiths' - Strangeways, Here We Come and Morrissey's Viva Hate). The Black Swan used a greater variety of musical instruments than their previous albums with bouzouki, güiro and accordion and a more obvious use of synths and programming. The title of the album was originally going to be Disappointment Resort Complex but was renamed to The Black Swan, which according to a 1989 interview by Stephen Phillips (NME) with David McComb is based on the 1954 novel of the same name by Thomas Mann.

== Background ==
The chosen single from the album, "Goodbye Little Boy", featured Jill Birt on vocals and 'glammed up' for the record sleeve.

"Too Hot To Move" was one of three songs written by David McComb which were used in the ABC TV series Sweet and Sour (1984) it had lead vocals by Deborah Conway (of Do-Ré-Mi). McComb bought back the rights to "Too Hot To Move" so that The Triffids could perform it again.

The cover photograph was taken in the stables at the rear of The Cliffe, the historic Peppermint Grove home in which David and Robert McComb grew up.

A deluxe version of the album, with a 17-track bonus disc of demos, was released in Australia on 7 June 2008 through Liberation Music.

When the album was reissued with extra tracks, "Evil" Graham Lee noted it had, "often been considered a stylistic mess but we thought it just our kind of mess. What's the matter with mess anyway? I've gone out on a limb with this one, at Dave's request. He had hoped this record could be a double album when it was recorded - he knew it was so varied that it sounded like nothing else anyone was doing at the time and he thought you shouldn't do things by halves.

== Reception ==
Professional ratings
Review scores
Source	Rating
AllMusic	3.5/5 stars
Encyclopedia of Popular Music	4/5 stars
The Great Rock Discography	7/10
Gigwise	9/10 stars
The Guardian	3/5 stars
The Line of Best Fit	88%
Ox-Fanzine	9/10
Q	4/5 stars
The Skinny	2/5 stars

Q said, "All 13 songs develop like variations on a theme. McComb usually portrays one half of a broken relationship contemplating sober or unsober home truths about life's fallibilities from uncomfortable isolation. The musical settings are constantly stunning."

AllMusic noted, "while previous Triffids albums were never homogeneous, on The Black Swan strikingly disparate stylistic elements rub shoulders, sometimes during the same song, from opera to funk to jazz to rap and hip-hop. Frontman David McComb saw the potential of rap and hip-hop to reenergize rock's increasingly dull, uniform idiom and several numbers blend genres in modest but prescient ways."

The Guardian said, "Black Swan was intended to be the Triffids' White Album. As is the often the way with such things, it wasn't - though the band's leader, the late David McComb, certainly had no shortage of ideas on how acoustic and electronic music could be put together. (Too many ideas, in fact: half of this could be painlessly dropped.)

== Track listing ==
All tracks written by Dave McComb unless otherwise noted.

1. "Too Hot to Move" - 4:12
2. "American Sailors" - 0:41
3. "Falling Over You" (David McComb, Adam Peters) - 3:43
4. "Goodbye Little Boy" (David McComb, Adam Peters) - 3:28
5. "Bottle of Love" (David McComb, Phil Kakulas, James Patterson) - 2:54
6. "The Spinning Top Song" (David McComb, Adam Peters) - 3:36
7. "Butterflies into Worms" (David McComb, Phil Kakulas) - 3:20
8. "New Year's Greetings" - 5:43
9. "Good Fortune Rose" (Jill Birt, Alsy MacDonald) - 3:33
10. "One Mechanic Town" - 3:11
11. "Blackeyed Susan" (David McComb, Phil Kakulas) - 4:02
12. "The Clown Prince" (David McComb, Phil Kakulas) - 4:37
13. "Fairytale Love" - 3:51

=== 2008 Reissue ===
Disc 1:

1. Too Hot to Move, Too Hot to Think
2. American Sailors
3. Falling Over You
4. Goodbye Little Boy
5. Bottle of Love
6. Go Home Eddie
7. The Spinning Top Song
8. Butterflies into Worms
9. I Can't Help Falling in Love
10. New Year's Greetings
11. Good Fortune Rose
12. Shell of the Man
13. One Mechanic Town
14. Jack's Hole
15. Black-Eyed Susan
16. You Minus Me
17. The Clown Prince
18. Fairytale Love
19. How Could I Help But Love You

Disc 2:

1. Too Hot to Move, Too Hot to Think (Demo)
2. American Sailors (Demo)
3. Why Don't You Leave for Good This Time (Demo)
4. Bottle of Love (Demo)
5. The Spinning Top Song (Demo)
6. Butterflies into Worms (Demo)
7. New Year's Greetings (The Country Widower) (Demo)
8. Good Fortune Rose (Demo)
9. One Mechanic Town (Demo)
10. Jack's Hole (Demo)
11. Black-Eyed Susan (Demo)
12. You Minus Me (Demo)
13. The Clown Prince (Demo)
14. Fairytale Love (Demo)
15. (You've Got) A Funny Way of Showing You Love Me (Demo)
16. No More After You (Demo)
17. In the Dark (Demo)

== Personnel ==
=== The Triffids ===
Credited to:

- David McComb
- Alsy MacDonald
- Robert McComb
- Martyn Casey
- 'Evil' Graham Lee
- Jill Birt

=== Additional musicians ===
- Adam Peters
- Philip Kakulas
- Rita Menendez

== Charts ==
Chart performance for The Black Swan
Chart (1989)	Peak position
Australian Albums (Kent Music Report)	59
Belgian Albums (Ultratop Flanders)	71
Dutch Albums (Album Top 100)	87
New Zealand Albums (RMNZ)	44
UK Albums (Official Charts)	63
