= Calenture (album) =

Studio album by The Triffids
- Released: November 1987
- Recorded: April – August 1987: Townhouse Three, Livingstone, Angel, Mark Angelo (London); Amazon (Liverpool); Wool Hall (Bath)
- Genres: Rock, folk rock
- Length: 46:24
- Labels: White/Hot, Island, Domino
- Producers: Gil Norton, The Triffids, Craig Leon

The Triffids chronology
In the Pines (1986)	Calenture (1987)	The Black Swan (1989)

Singles from Calenture
- 1. "Bury Me Deep in Love" Released: October 1987; 2. "Trick of the Light" Released: January 1988; 3. "Holy Water" Released: August 1988

Calenture is the fourth studio album by Australian rock group The Triffids, it was released in November 1987 and saw them explore themes of insanity, deception and rootlessness—the title refers to a fever suffered by sailors during long hot voyages. It reached No. 32 on the Australian Kent Music Report Albums Chart. In November 1987, it reached No. 24 on the Swedish Albums Chart, in May 1988 it peaked at No. 25 on the New Zealand Albums Chart. The album spawned three singles, "Bury Me Deep in Love" (1987), "Trick of the Light" and "Holy Water" (both in 1988). The latter track was recorded with American producer Craig Leon.

In 2007 Calenture was re-released as a 2× CD with five bonus tracks on the first disc and twelve tracks on the second disc, mostly rehearsal or studio demos of the original album tracks. In February it appeared on the Belgium Albums Chart Top 60.

== Background ==
=== Production ===
The recording sessions for Calenture began in April 1987 with American producer Craig Leon appointed by Island Records. However, it became clear, at least to The Triffids, that Leon (and Island Records) were primarily interested in lead singer and lead guitarist David McComb and not the rest of the band: Alsy MacDonald on drums and backing vocals; Robert McComb on guitar, backing vocals and violin; Martyn P. Casey on bass guitar; Jill Birt on keyboards; and Graham Lee on guitar. "Bury Me Deep in Love" and "Holy Water" were recorded as singles but the group were not satisfied with Leon. According to Lee:

In the tried and true way of all major labels at the time, they really wanted to sign Dave but got a troublesome band instead. It was probably Island's insistence that Alsy and Marty weren't up to it that caused the Craig Leon sessions to be the unmitigated disaster that they were. Now I could be wrong here, maybe Craig wanted them out, maybe both. We were pretty much forced to let a couple of session guys stand in – no names because it wasn't their fault – and we could tell straight away that this was applying a straightener to the normally unruly quiff that was the band. It was also sucking the essence of the band out. Anyway, it's a sorry little interlude that I should draw the curtain on. The sessions were scrapped and we were allowed to be The Triffids again.

Island Records then brought in Lenny Kaye, "who made a few suggestions... 'Some of them were a bit odd' David recalls, 'like his calypso/reggae version of "Trick of the Light"' Rob: 'A bit odd! Basically we just shot them down in flames'". Nevertheless Kaye felt that the Triffids and their material were impressive enough and that they did not need his help. Eventually Gil Norton who had worked on their 1986 album, Born Sandy Devotional, was brought back to re-record Calenture. The album was released in November 1987 by White/Hot Records for the Australian market and by Island Records for Europe, United Kingdom, and United States.

In 2007 Domino Records released a remastered edition as a 2× CD with five bonus tracks on the first disc and a second disc including 12 bonus tracks, mostly rehearsal demos of the original album's tracks.

=== Composition ===
The term calenture is described in the sleeve notes as: "Tropical fever or delirium suffered by sailors after long periods away from land, who imagine the seas to be green fields and desire to leap into them". In February 1988 David McComb, in an interview with Paul Mathur and Stephen Phillips for Rock Australia Magazine (RAM), described Calenture as an "over-the-top record" and even called it the Triffids' Heaven's Gate. The Triffids were nomadic, travelling back and forth from Australia to England to record the 'difficult' album and related to the disoriented sailors.

David McComb is the principal songwriter, "it's upon [his] shoulders that most of the weight has been borne. It's the weight of lyrics which have been far more personal now... so intensely personal you can almost feel the pain". Wilson Neate of Perfect Sound Forever found that a "sense of alienation, betrayal, insanity and solitude still permeates his writing, although Calenture seems less explicitly imbued with Western Australian imagery than the previous records". Mathur and Phillips describe the album as "far and away the most 'produced' record The Triffids have ever done... packed full of little electronic surprises: drum computers, synthesisers, samplers, even a gadget that goes 'woop'".

== Reception ==
Professional ratings
Review scores
Source	Rating
AllMusic	4.5/5 stars
Encyclopedia of Popular Music	3/5 stars
Gigwise	8/10 stars
The Great Rock Discography	8/10
The Irish Times	3/5 stars
NME	8/10 stars
Ox-Fanzine	10/10
Record Collector	4/5 stars
Rolling Stone	4/5 stars

Calenture, saw The Triffids explore themes of insanity, deception and rootlessness. AllMusic's Michael Sutton found "there's an undeniably spiritual feel to several of the songs" where "David McComb spews his words with the fiery passion of a backwoods preacher". Sutton advises "Fans of Nick Cave will immediately be seduced by McComb's bluesy croon; deep and brimming with palpable sorrow, [his] voice never dwindles in intensity". David Fricke writing for Rolling Stone observed that the album "is about the chills and delusions suffered by lovers separated too long from each other and from reality". Mathur and Phillips summarised, "[it] is a precise and masterful record. Eleven songs and one instrumental together illustrate the heights which such finely crafted music can attain". NME's Stephen Worthy reviewed the 2007 version and felt it was "even more difficult to understand why [the band] weren’t at rock’s top table with U2 and R.E.M.". Mess+Noise's Lauren Zoric compared the 2007 versions of Calenture and In the Pines (originally issued in 1986), "Calenture emerged from the woolshed chrysalis. It is The Triffids' pop album, and remains a sweeping, majestic masterpiece. McComb's voice is overwhelming, a terrifying embodiment of ruinous emotions reined into literary form".

== Legacy ==
The album was included in the book 1001 Albums You Must Hear Before You Die.

== Track listing ==
All tracks are written by David McComb, unless otherwise noted

No.	Title	Length
1.	"Bury Me Deep in Love"	4:04
2.	"Kelly's Blues"	4:34
3.	"Trick of the Light" (David McComb, Graham Lee)	3:50
4.	"Hometown Farewell Kiss"	4:33
5.	"Unmade Love"	4:01
6.	"Open for You" (Jill Birt)	3:05
7.	"Holy Water"	3:17
8.	"Blinder by the Hour"	4:24
9.	"Vagabond Holes"	3:57
10.	"Jerdacuttup Man" (McComb, James Paterson)	4:59
11.	"Calenture"	1:10
12.	"Save What You Can" (McComb, Paterson)	4:30

=== 2007 Reissue ===
All tracks are written by David McComb, unless otherwise noted

Disc 1
No.	Title	Length
1.	"Bury Me Deep in Love"	4:04
2.	"Kelly's Blues"	4:34
3.	"Trick of the Light" (David McComb, Graham Lee)	3:50
4.	"Hometown Farewell Kiss"	4:33
5.	"Unmade Love"	4:01
6.	"Open for You" (Jill Birt)	3:05
7.	"Holy Water"	3:17
8.	"Blinder by the Hour"	4:24
9.	"Vagabond Holes"	3:57
10.	"Jerdacuttup Man" (McComb, James Paterson)	4:59
11.	"Calenture"	1:10
12.	"Save What You Can" (McComb, Paterson)	4:30
13.	"Baby Can I Walk You Home" (Bonus track)	2:38
14.	"Region Unknown" (Bonus track)	4:11
15.	"Love the Fever" (McComb, Adam Peters) (Bonus track)	4:43
16.	"Bad News Always Reminds Me of You" (Bonus track)	3:15
17.	"Everything You Touch Turns to Time" (Bonus track)	3:29
Total length:		64:40

All tracks are written by David McComb, unless otherwise noted

Disc 2
No.	Title	Demo type	Length
1.	"Bury Me Deep in Love"	rehearsal	4:16
2.	"Kelly's Blues"	rehearsal	4:10
3.	"A Trick of the Light" (David McComb, Graham Lee)	rehearsal	3:05
4.	"Hometown Farewell Kiss"	rehearsal	4:25
5.	"There Must Be a Curse on Me"	studio	3:48
6.	"Open for You" (Jill Birt)	rehearsal	2:22
7.	"Burned"	studio	4:16
8.	"Blinder by the Hour"	rehearsal	2:58
9.	"Vagabond Holes"	rehearsal	4:08
10.	"Jerdacuttup Man" (McComb, James Paterson)	rehearsal	3:57
11.	"Save What You Can" (McComb, Paterson)	studio	4:08
12.	"Calentura"	original	1:42
Total length:			43:15

== Charts ==
Chart performance for Calenture
Chart (1987)	Peak position
Australian Albums (ARIA)	32
Belgian Albums (Ultratop Flanders)	58
New Zealand Albums (RMNZ)	25
Swedish Albums (Sverigetopplistan)	24

== Personnel ==
Credits for Callenture:

The Triffids members

- Jill Birt – keyboards
- Martyn P. Casey – bass guitar
- Graham Lee – guitar, autoharp
- Alsy MacDonald – drums, backing vocals
- David McComb – vocals, guitar, arrangement (strings)
- Robert McComb – guitar, backing vocals, violin

Other musicians

- Nick Allum – drums
- Neil Conti – drums
- Mick Doonan – musician
- Keith Hancock – musician
- Ben Hoffnung – musician
- Billy Kinsely – musician
- Craig Leon – background vocals (track 1)
- Jane Norton – musician
- Adam Peters – guitar, keyboards, arrangement (strings)
- Sean Pugh – musician (Piano)

Production work

- Producer – Adam Peters, David McComb, Gil Norton, Craig Leon
- Engineer – Andy Mason, Ben Kape, George Schilling (George Shilling), Gil Norton, Keith Andrews, Marc Crellin, Mark Angelo Lusardi, Tony Harris
- Mastering – Tim Young
  - Reissue mastering – Lachlan Carrick, François Tétaz (2007 version)
- Mixing – Ben Kape, David Bascombe, Gil Norton, Mark Wallis
- Programmer – Adam Peters

Art work

- Artwork – Island Art
