= Spanish Blue (song) =

Single by The Triffids
- A-side: "Spanish Blue"
- B-side: "Twisted Brain"
- Released: 1982
- Recorded: April 1982; Albert Studios, Sydney
- Genre: Indie rock, Folk rock
- Length: 6:14
- Label: No, White Label/Mushroom
- Songwriter(s): David McComb
- Producer(s): Les Karski

The Triffids singles chronology
| "Stand Up" (1981) | "Spanish Blue" (1982) | "Beautiful Waste" (1984) |

Spanish Blue is the second single released by Australian rock group, The Triffids in 1982. The single was produced by Les Karski (The Nauts, Ray Arnott, Midnight Oil) for the White Label Records imprint of Mushroom Records, owned by Michael Gudinski. The single was initially released independently by No Records but was re-released in October 1982 following the band's signing with White Label Records.

They'd recorded "Spanish Blue" when the spectre of the Gudinski organisation loomed, and they were summoned to the Mushroom/White Citadel. Gudinski liked "Spanish Blue". 'It was just that he wanted us to re-write it, and re-mix it,' McComb laughs. 'We ended up putting it out ourselves immediately they started dilly dallying because we said we wouldn't re-mix it. We thought that we couldn't just wait for people to decide what they wanted to do.'

== Track listing ==
All tracks written by David McComb.

1. "Spanish Blue" – 2:12
2. "Twisted Brain" – 4:02

== Personnel ==
- David McComb – lead vocals, guitar
- Robert McComb – guitar, vocals, castanets
- Jill Yates – keyboards, tambourine
- Byron Sinclair – bass
- Alsy MacDonald – drums
