= Acuff's Rose =

Australian country rock group

- Origin: Melbourne, Victoria, Australia
- Genre: Country rock
- Years active: 1991–1997
- Labels: Torn & Frayed, Shock, Last Call
- Past members: Jack Coleman; James Hurst; Martin Lewis; Kay-Louise Patterson; Jeff Williams; Bruce Kane

Acuff's Rose were an Australian country rock group formed in 1991 by Jack Coleman on bass guitar, James Hurst on drums, Martin Lewis on guitar, Kay-Louise Patterson on keyboards and vocals, and Jeff Williams on vocals and guitar. They released two albums on Torn & Frayed Records, Never Comin' Down (1993) and Son of the North Wind (1995) before disbanding by 1997.

== Biography ==
Acuff's Rose were formed as a country rock group in Melbourne in 1991 by Jack Coleman on bass guitar, James Hurst on drums, Martin Lewis on guitar, Kay-Louise Patterson (ex-Battle Happy) on keyboards and vocals, and Jeff Williams on vocals and guitar. The group were named for United States' 1940s country music artist, Roy Acuff, his songwriting partner, Fred Rose, and their publishing company, Acuff-Rose Music. By July 1992 Acuff's Rose had signed with the Torn & Frayed label on Shock Records which issued their debut extended play, Long Past Dawn.

By June 1993 Bruce Kane had replaced Hurst on drums and they released their first studio album, Never Comin' Down. Guest musicians on the album include three former members of The Triffids: David McComb, Robert McComb and Graham Lee; as well as Charlie Owen and Chris Wilson.

In November 1995 their second album, Son of the North Wind, appeared with guest musicians including Spencer P. Jones and The Coral Snakes' Robin Casinader. The album was produced by Conway Savage, Julian Wu and Acuff's Rose. The album was later issued in France, Patterson and Williams promoted the release by touring there as a duo. By 1997 Acuff's Rose had disbanded. In 2002 Jeff Williams and the Clear Spacemen released White Under Green. In 2007 Patterson issued her debut solo album, International Travel.

== Members ==
- Jack Coleman – bass guitar (1991–1996)
- James Hurst – drums (1991–1993)
- Martin Lewis – guitar (1991–1996)
- Kay-Louise Patterson – keyboards, vocals, piano, organ (Hammond) (1991–1997)
- Jeff Williams – vocals, guitar, acoustic guitar (1991–1997)
- Bruce Kane – drums (1993–1996)

== Discography ==
=== Extended plays ===
- Long Past Dawn (July 1992) – Torn & Frayed / Shock Records

=== Studio albums ===
- Never Comin' Down (June 1993) – Torn & Frayed / Shock Records
- Son of the North Wind (November 1995) – Torn & Frayed / Shock Records (TORNCD11)
