= Lawson Square Infirmary =

EP by The Triffids and James Paterson
- Released: November 1984
- Recorded: Sydney Opera House; August 1984
- Genres: Rock, folk rock
- Label: Hot

The Triffids chronology
| Raining Pleasure (1984) | Lawson Square Infirmary (1984) | Field of Glass (1985) |

Lawson Square Infirmary was a 12" extended play released in November 1984 by the Triffids and James Paterson under the collaborative project of the same name. In 2008 all six tracks from the EP were included on the compilation Beautiful Waste and Other Songs.

Lawson Square Infirmary was the result of a one-off recording collaboration between members of the Triffids and Sydney musician James Paterson, of JFK & The Cuban Crisis, who financed the recording and was the Triffids' singer David McComb's occasional song writing collaborator. The performances were recorded in a couple of takes live to stereo at the Sydney Opera House shortly before the Triffids relocated to London in late August 1984. It was also the first Triffids-related release to include 'Evil' Graham Lee, who later joined the band. The Triffids shared a rambling, run down house in Lawson Square, Redfern in Sydney.

Lawson Square Infirmary neatly illustrates Dave's quest for diversity and the prodigious output of songs he had at the time

— Graham Lee,

== Details ==
In the liner notes to Beautiful Waste and Other Songs: Paterson's history of the recording of Lawson Square Infirmary recounts how the collaboration began when he visited the Triffids' Sydney house for a "typically economical dinner" and played for McComb a riff he had invented that afternoon. McComb seemed to improvise a melody spontaneously and provided lyrics: the song "Figurines" had just appeared. Paterson visited the group again and McComb was eager to follow a particular musical avenue, asking Paterson if he had any other songs in a country vein. Paterson offered "When My Heart Breaks", which was suitably slowed down by McComb.

With Alsy MacDonald providing "Mother Silhouette", a small repertoire of country-style songs had developed. Paterson suggested recording them for amusement, but McComb and the other Triffids pushed to actually release them, albeit with two conditions. They were penniless and about to leave for England, so they could not pay for the recording, and they felt that at that time they had glutted the market with several recent releases, so the record should be a Lawson Square Infirmary project, not a Triffids' endeavour.

Pursuing the notion that he and McComb had just formed a distinct country band, Paterson asked Graham Lee to play dobro for the project, in order to boost the country sound and to make the personnel less obviously just the Triffids. In fact he had just introduced a new member to them. He also found a remarkable bass player, Daubney Carshott. Carshott was a man of coincidence, sharing the name of the lead from a 1937 Australian film, Lovers and Luggers, and the musical skills of the Triffids' Martyn Casey, whom he also strangely resembled. Paterson scared up a recording session with a well-respected sound engineer. She offered to record some songs to DAT and although the musicians had some misgivings about this still novel and reportedly 'cold' digital technology, the offer had the double advantage of prestige, set to take place at the Sydney Opera House, and frugality, to happen on the sly from midnight to dawn. Lawson Square Infirmary was recorded in only a few hours on the Triffids' last weekend in Sydney.

The EP was released with two different coloured sleeves – pink text/images on a pale yellow background, and brown text/images on a pale yellow background. The pink sleeves were the result of incorrect printing and have not been reproduced since the initial pressing. Paterson reports that the incorrect printing resulted in one of the few strained moments in his and McComb's friendship when McComb, back in Perth, thought Paterson had allowed this "monstrosity".

== Reception ==
Professional ratings
Review scores
| Source | Rating |
|---|---|
| Rolling Stone Australia | 3/5 stars |

== Track listing ==
1. "Figurine"
2. "When My Heart Breaks"
3. "Mother Silhouette"
4. "Mercy"
5. "Crucifixion Speech"
6. "Not The Marrying Kind"

== Personnel ==
Credited to:

- David McComb - vocals, guitar, percussion
- Robert McComb - violin
- Alsy MacDonald - guitar, vocals, percussion
- James Paterson - vocals, guitar, mandolin, piano
- Graham Lee - vocals, dobro
- Daubney Carshott (aka Martyn Casey) - bass
