= Treeless Plain =

Studio album by The Triffids
- Released: November 1983
- Recorded: Emerald City Studios, Sydney; August/September, 1983
- Genre: Folk rock
- Label: Hot Records/Rough Trade
- Producer: The Triffids

The Triffids chronology
Bad Timing and Other Stories (1983)	Treeless Plain (1983)	Love in Bright Landscapes (1986)

Professional ratings
Review scores
Source	Rating
Allmusic	3/5 stars

Treeless Plain is the debut album by The Triffids, released in November, 1983. The album was recorded at Emerald City Studios, Sydney, Australia in twelve midnight to dawn sessions, during August through to September 1983. It was the band's first release after signing with Hot Records.

A remastered version of the album, with seven bonus live tracks recorded in 1983, was released in Australia in June 2008 through Liberation Music.

== Details ==
David McComb later said, "I don't think it's a great record, but at least we tried to do a few things that pub bands wouldn't normally do. For a lot of the underground scene all across Australia, we just weren't hard rock enough. We used to have a thing against pedals." Elsewhere, he said, "I wouldn't have wanted it rawer, and I wouldn't have wanted it any slicker. It doesn't sound like it was rushed at all. We just wanted a crispness and brightness, and a sort of relaxed feeling. The usual criticism is that there's too much variety, to which we always point to the rest of the music industry and say there's not enough."

"Evil" Graham Lee (not a member of the band until later) said, "The band recorded Treeless Plain in a dozen midnight-to-dawn sessions with a young, green recording engineer called Nick Mainsbridge. Dave had put a lot of thought into how the songs would be recorded and mixed and, fortunately, his production notes still exist, because they came in very handy when Nick got the chance to remix the album in 2007." Producing themselves was not always easy, with David McComb later admitting "Robert and I had quite a few blues".

The album was named after the Nullarbor Plain, which Robert McComb estimated they crossed eleven times travelling from Perth to the east coast of Australia. He said, "It took five days in my Combivan, and then three days once we got a van that could do better than 80 km (50 mi) an hour. We hit a couple of roos in that one. One of them almost totalled the car. At one point, Dave wanted to call the album $2,000 Kangaroo."

== Reception ==
An AllMusic review claimed, "Treeless Plain underscores The Triffids' knack for blending folk and country with indie rock in a way that anticipated the rise of alt-country in the '90s." David McComb's "commanding and resonant" vocals were particularly praised, and the songs, "offered incontrovertible evidence of McComb's skill as a songwriter with a unique lyrical and musical vision."

Clinton Walker described the album as, "a remarkably mature, muscular yet sensitive statement, and it was probably as broadly successful as any Australian indy has ever been. But that still didn't mean big figures." Elsewhere, it was said that the album would endear itself to listeners, "assuming, of course, that you can envisage a band that links folksy sounds, replete with fiddles, with those you might expect of some early Velvet Underground."

== Track listing ==
All songs written by David McComb unless otherwise noted.

1. "Red Pony" – 4:11
2. "Branded" – 2:44
3. "My Baby Thinks She's a Train" – 3:36
4. "Rosevel" – 2:59
5. "I Am a Lonesome Hobo" (Bob Dylan) – 2:14
6. "Place in the Sun" – 2:22
7. "Plaything" – 3:10
8. "Old Ghostrider" – 3:09
9. "Hanging Shed" – 4:02
10. "Hell of a Summer" – 4:30
11. "Madeline" – 2:35
12. "Nothing Can Take Your Place" – 2:49

== 2008 Reissue ==
1. "Red Pony"
2. "Branded"
3. "My Baby Thinks She's a Train"
4. "Rosevel"
5. "I Am a Lonesome Hobo"
6. "Place in the Sun"
7. "Plaything"
8. "Old Ghostrider"
9. "Hanging Shed"
10. "Hell of a Summer"
11. "Madeline"
12. "Nothing Can Take Your Place
13. "Interview" (Live at the Wireless)
14. "Old Ghostrider" (Live at the Wireless)
15. "Plaything" (Live at the Wireless)
16. "My Baby Thinks She's a Train" (Live at the Wireless)
17. "Rosevel" (Live at the Wireless)
18. "Hell of a Summer" (Live at the Wireless)
19. "On the Street Where You Live" (Live at the Wireless)

== Personnel ==
=== The Triffids ===
Credited to:

- Alsy MacDonald – drums, vocals, percussion, hammer
- David McComb – lead vocals, guitar, piano
- Robert McComb – violin, guitar, saw, keyboards, vocals
- Martyn Casey – bass, vocals
- Jill Birt – organ

=== Additional musicians ===
- Ian Macourt – cello
- David Angell – viola

=== Production ===
- Audio Engineer – Nick Mainsbridge
