= Bad Timing and Other Stories =

EP by The Triffids
- Released: April 1983
- Recorded: A.A.V. Studios, Melbourne; October 1982
- Genre: Rock, folk rock
- Label: White Label/Mushroom
- Producer: Robert Ash

The Triffids chronology
Reverie (1982)	Bad Timing and Other Stories (1983)	Treeless Plain (1983)

Bad Timing and Other Stories is the second official recording by The Triffids, released as a 7" extended play in April 1983. Its four tracks were produced by Robert Ash for White Records Label an imprint of Mushroom Records.

Although the band had admired Ash's work with the Only Ones, they were disappointed with the results. McComb said, "It was good in one way, because it made us realise that the band could produce itself by that stage, and that we'd learnt enough after making 4 records. In fact, we probably should have started producing ourselves earlier. In our case, as long as we have the right engineer, we can make all the right decisions."

== Track listing ==
1. "Bad Timing"
2. "Left to Rot"
3. "Being Driven"
4. "Snake Pit"

== Personnel ==
Credited to:

- David McComb - lead vocals, guitar, organ, piano, synthesiser
- Robert McComb - guitar, violin, organ
- Alsy MacDonald - drums, vocals, piano
- Martyn Casey - bass, vocals
- Simon 'LeTact' Cromack - percussion
