= Born Sandy Devotional =

Studio album by the Triffids
- Released: 24 March 1986
- Recorded: August 1985
- Studio: Mark Angelo Studios (27 Britton Street), London
- Genre: Rock; folk rock
- Length: 35:51 (original); 72:36 (2006 reissue)
- Label: Hot
- Producer: Gil Norton; The Triffids

The Triffids chronology
Love in Bright Landscapes (1986)	Born Sandy Devotional (1986)	In the Pines (1986)

Singles from Born Sandy Devotional
- 1. "Wide Open Road" Released: February 1986

Born Sandy Devotional is the second studio album by the Triffids, released in March 1986.

The album was recorded at Mark Angelo Studios in London in August 1985 with Gil Norton co-producing with the band, and mixed at Amazon Studios in Liverpool in September 1985. The cover photo shows Mandurah, Western Australia – now a large urban centre – as it appeared in 1961.

== Recording ==
When we finished 'Born Sandy Devotional' I knew it was the best thing we'd ever done, there was no question about it. The writing was much more autobiographical than anything I'd done before, I felt quite close to the subject matter. I found myself almost following the idea of fidelity as a complete all-consuming faith, to give you some sort of direction or something.

And 'Born Sandy Devotional'? It was the name of a song which didn't make it onto the record which is about someone called Sandy ... I like titles like those, they're just a law unto themselves and they have a feeling unto themselves.

'Born Sandy Devotional' is the culmination of our efforts trying to capture our more considered lyrical approach with a physical intensity ... well not really, but that will have to do. (David McComb)

Born Sandy Devotional was the first album recorded with an outside producer, with David McComb admitting to arguments within the band over production in the past. He said he knew, "it was time to get someone in there. It get's a bit difficult, especially now with 6 of us in the band." A publicist they shared with Echo & the Bunnymen had recommended Gil Norton. The band were "resigned to producing ourselves, then we got Gil literally three days before we were due to record". With the use of vibraphones, cellos and keyboards, McComb believed at least half of the album would not be played live.

== Critical reception ==
Professional ratings
Review scores
Source	Rating
AllMusic	5/5 stars
The Austin Chronicle	2.5/5 stars
Encyclopedia of Popular Music	5/5 stars
The Great Rock Discography	9/10
The Guardian	4/5 stars
Mojo	4/5 stars
PopMatters	7/10
Q	4/5 stars
Sounds	5/5 stars
Stylus Magazine	B+

The album has been widely praised by critics. Writing for the NME, Mat Snow described it as "a masterpiece....and boldly reoccupies the territory rock has abandoned in its retreat into self obsession, and so throws down the challenge to the rest of the field. Have you the imagination to accept?"

Sounds Jonh Wilde wrote that "All the other rock is howling around, picking the sand out of its eyes, and The Triffids, on this hurricane form, make it look like a swarm of legless lizards. They've evidently taken their time, but unleash their true masterpiece when their nearest rivals clog their own arteries with pomp and frigid pretentiousness."

Adam Sweeting of Melody Maker said that "At last somebody's released Born Sandy Devotional, which was finished nearly a year ago but has been bouncing around between dithering record companies ever since. God knows why because it's a classic, 10 songs of love and life in a hostile sub-tropical landscape. David McComb wrote the lot and it's a substantial achievement. His lyrics display real writer's insight, and mould imperceptibly to his unhurried melodies....In The Seabirds, he explores a drowning love affair in a song so vivid it resembles a short story with pictures."

== Legacy ==
On 11 August 2007, SBS in Australia aired a one-hour documentary on the Triffids and Born Sandy Devotional as the 1980s' representative of their Great Australian Albums series. In October 2010 it was listed at No. 5 in the book 100 Best Australian Albums.

== Track listing ==
All songs are written by David McComb.

1. "The Seabirds" – 3:20
2. "Estuary Bed" – 4:49
3. "Chicken Killer" – 3:51
4. "Tarrilup Bridge" – 3:21
5. "Lonely Stretch" – 5:02
6. "Wide Open Road" – 4:08
7. "Life of Crime" – 4:24
8. "Personal Things" – 2:57
9. "Stolen Property" – 6:47
10. "Tender Is the Night (The Long Fidelity)" – 3:53

Remastered edition

11. "The 107" – 3:28: Recorded on an early four track cassette Portastudio in November 1984 and mixed at Greg Wadley's Spill Studios in January 2006. "The 107" and "When a Man Turns Bad" run into each other on the original recording, probably accidentally, and have been deliberately left this way on the remastered edition.
12. "When a Man Turns Bad" – 4:35
13. "Of the Plaza" – 2:40: Was originally recorded as a solo vocal version on a 1984 cassette labelled New Songs. According to the album liner notes it appeared once in an early list of possible songs for Born Sandy Devotional.
14. "White Shawl" – 1:08: Was also found on the same cassette as the previous track.
15. "Convent Walls" – 4:04: A song that appeared in early track lists for Born Sandy Devotional but was eventually relegated to B side status. Recorded in Albert Studios in Sydney, 1985 with Margaret Labi guesting on backing vocals.
16. "Time of Weakness" – 3:12: This song, according to the album liner notes, was a part of Born Sandy Devotional until a very late stage, where it got bumped for the track, "Personal Things", as there was an issue with the running time or length of the LP. This version of the song was recorded live by Mitch Jones on 23 November 1985 at the Graphic Arts Club in Sydney and mixed by Rob Muir in Perth.
17. "Born Sandy Devotional" – 5:07: This version has been reworked, as it only ever appeared as a truncated version on the album, In the Pines.
18. "Wish to See No More" – 1:59: This is another song that was listed for inclusion on Born Sandy Devotional and also for In the Pines but was not included on either.
19. "Tender Is the Night (The Long Fidelity) Alt. vers." – 3:40: Was recorded on the same cassette as the first two songs, "The 107" and "When a Man Turns Bad", with McComb and Birt singing this as a duet.
20. "Wide Open Road" – video track

== Personnel ==
The Triffids

- David McComb – vocals, guitar, keyboards
- "Evil" Graham Lee – pedal and lap steel guitar
- Martyn Casey – bass guitar
- Jill Birt – vocals, keyboards
- Robert McComb – violin, guitar, backing vocals
- Alsy MacDonald – drums, backing vocals

Additional musicians

- Sally Collins – backing vocals
- Fay Brown – backing vocals
- Adam Peters – cello, keyboards, piano
- Chris Abrahams – piano, vibraphone
- Lesley Wynne – viola

== Charts ==
Charts (1986)	Peak position
Australian Albums (Kent Music Report)	37
Belgian Albums (Ultratop Flanders)	39
Swedish Albums (Sverigetopplistan)	18
