= Jill Birt =

Australian rock musician and architect

- Born: Jillian Margaret Birt; Tambellup, Western Australia, Australia
- Genre: Rock
- Occupations: Musician, singer, architect
- Instruments: Keyboard, piano, organ, vocals
- Years active: 1983–present

Jillian Margaret Birt (born 1960) is an Australian rock musician and architect. Birt was the keyboardist and vocalist of the alternative rock and pop band, The Triffids from 1983 to 1989. In 2008, The Triffids were inducted into the Australian Recording Industry Association Hall of Fame.

== Biography ==
=== Early years ===
Jillian Margaret Birt was born in Tambellup, a rural agricultural region of Western Australia 317 km south east of Perth. Her parents were grain and sheep farmers. With her two older brothers, Birt was raised in a deeply religious household. Birt attended the local Tambellup Primary School and then boarded at the Methodist Ladies' College in Perth. After secondary education Birt studied fine arts and formed an all-girl punk band, What Are Little Boys Made Of. Later she was a member of Precious Title.

=== The Triffids 1983–1989 ===
In April 1983, Jill Birt became a member of the alternative rock and pop band, The Triffids, replacing the band's original keyboardist, Margaret Gillard. The group had formed in Perth in 1978 and, by early 1983, had a line-up of Martyn P. Casey on bass guitar, David McComb on acoustic guitar and lead vocals, his older brother Robert McComb on violin and guitar, and Alan 'Alsy' MacDonald on drums and vocals. They had signed to Mushroom Records' White Label and released the Bad Timing and Other Stories extended play in March. The Triffids had relocated to Sydney, where Birt joined on piano, organ and vocals.

The band's first 12-inch vinyl LP, Treeless Plain, was released in November 1983 by Hot Records. It had been recorded at Emerald City Studios, Sydney, in twelve midnight to dawn sessions, during August through to September with The Triffids self-producing. In April 1984 they returned to the studio with producer Nick Mainsbridge – who had engineered Treeless Plain – to record a seven-track EP, Raining Pleasure, which was issued on Hot Records in June. According to rock music historian, Ian McFarlane, "it was another superb release highlighted by the shimmering title track 'Raining Pleasure' (sung by Birt), the atmospheric country-blues of 'Jesus Calling' and a mournful rendering of the traditional blues tune 'St James Infirmary'".

In August 1984 the band relocated to London, where they recorded the critically acclaimed album, Born Sandy Devotional in August 1985, which was issued on Mushroom Records in March 1986. The Triffids line-up now included 'Evil' Graham Lee on pedal steel and guitar. Lee had recorded the EP, Lawson Square Infirmary (October 1984) as a side-project by The Triffids members except Birt. Born Sandy Devotional was produced by Gil Norton with Mansbridge engineering. Birt provides vocals for the album's closing track, "Tender Is the Night (The Long Fidelity)". In October 2010, the album was listed at No. 5 in the book, 100 Best Australian Albums by music journalists, John O'Donnell, Toby Creswell and Craig Mathieson. The authors described its final tracks:

The swirling strings and the crescendo of "Stolen Property" hangs in the air as Casey's bass steps forward to accompany Jill Birt's dry, fragile voice on "Tender Is the Night (The Long Fidelity)" ... Birt sings, 'He never asks after her anymore/He made a point of losing her address' as though her friend has hardened his heart to its defence. Later Birt is joined by David McComb who suggests they go out but his thoughts inexorably turn to the ex-lover on the other side of the world with the exquisite lines 'It's getting dark earlier now/But where you are it's just getting light' ... It's a devastating song, so full of sadness.

— O'Donnell, Creswell and Mathieson, 100 Best Australian Albums, p. 35.

Through the rest of 1985 and early the next year, The Triffids toured Europe. They returned to Australia to tour and in April 1986 they recorded their next studio album, In the Pines, on the McCombs' family property in Ravensthorpe, about 540 km south east of Perth. For the album Birt is credited with keyboards and metal percussion. In 1987 the band signed a three-record deal with Island Records, which saw the release of Calenture which had been recorded from April to August and was issued in November that year. Penny Black Music's John Clarkson declared "[t]he breezy 'Trick of the Light', another failed single and an attempt at a pop number, pushes Jill Birt’s cascading, gorgeous keyboards to the fore, but again has a bleak undercurrent". The track, "Open for You", was co-written by Birt and David McComb. It reminded Rolling Stone's David Fricke of "Lou Reed's acoustic lullabies with The Velvet Underground (no small thanks to the whispery Mo Tucker-style harmonies by pianist Jill Birt), is ostensibly a song of forgiveness. But the gruesome imagery in the second verse – 'Well, they've dug up the patch/And found the remains ... hidden beneath that old stone/Where we carved our names on the underside' – makes you wonder if McComb is singing about emotional resilience or romantic delusion".

The Triffid's final studio album, The Black Swan, was released in April 1989. Birt's vocals were highlighted on the album's lead single "Goodbye Little Boy", issued in March which reached No. 81 on the Australian Kent Music Report Singles Chart. The single's cover depicts a close-up of Birt in sunglasses. Allmusic's Wilson Neate discovered her "little-girl voice and an electronic sheen make 'Goodbye Little Boy' one of the band's purest pop statements". "Good Fortune Rose" from the album is another composition by Birt – co-written with MacDonald. In April 1989 NME's Gavin Martin described "Goodbye Little Boy" as "a modern girlie pop classic – breathy charm with a sting in the tale, a sure fire hit whenever the necessary radio edit has been made of the line 'I'm so fucking tired'" and found her own composition, "Good Fortune Rose" to be "a delicately blossoming thing etching a young girl's aspirations on the cusp of womanhood – a heady mix of innocence and sophistication". David McComb described her songwriting "[t]he great thing about Jill’s songs is that they're the first she's ever written and the first 10 songs that anyone writes are usually the best, they're so fresh and alive ... When Jill was going to join the band I interviewed a techno keyboard player who was a brilliant musician but he wasn't right. Jill joined for fun, friendship and adventure. Those are far better reasons". In August 1989, tired from the constant travelling and touring, the band dissolved.

=== Post-Triffids ===
Jill Birt married MacDonald, and they have three children, the family reside in East Fremantle. In 1990, The Triffids were honoured at the West Australian Music Industry Awards with a trophy for 'Most Outstanding International Achievement Award'.

I remember one night at the Burswood Casino, it must have been in about 1990. The Western Australia Music Industry had this big event at the showroom and someone announced the winner of the most outstanding WA contribution to the national and international music scene. It was The Triffids. There was a young woman who was working at the show serving drinks. All of a sudden, she put down her tray, walked up on stage in her Burswood uniform and collected the prize. It was Jill Birt, the keyboardist. While the rest of the music industry was sitting around in black ties and tuxes, the only person from the band who was there to accept the award was serving them drinks. It was very telling.

— Steve Gordon, Western Australian music industry insider, quoted in Barass, Tony (17 April 1999), "Beautiful Waste", The Australian.

In 1993, Birt studied architecture at the University of Western Australia and became a qualified architect, whilst MacDonald is a lawyer for the Equal Opportunity Commission in Perth. In February 1999 David McComb died of heroin toxicity and mild acute rejection of his 1996 heart transplant. Both Birt and MacDonald have performed on The Triffids reunions, in June 2006, and January 2008. Surviving members of The Triffids – Birt, Casey, Lee, MacDonald and Robert McComb – were joined by guest singers and musicians, Mick Harvey (The Bad Seeds), Toby Martin (Youth Group), Mark and Rob Snarski (The Blackeyed Susans), Steve Kilbey (The Church) and Melanie Oxley. Graham Hill of ABC's national radio's Dig Music, found the "delivery of 'Goodbye Little Boy' was as close to 'original line-up' as you could hope for, but throughout the evening it was hard to shake the obvious absence – this was not a reunion, it was a celebration of a songwriter". Hill noted "[t]he final song was left to Jill Birt, who offered a word-perfect rendition of 'Tender Is the Night' despite losing her lyrics amidst the mountain of crib sheets of earlier singers". The 2008 performances were issued as a DVD documentary, It's Raining Pleasure (2009), directed by Steven Levett.

On 1 July 2008, The Triffids were inducted by Nick Cave into the ARIA Hall of Fame; former members were joined on-stage by Snarski as vocalist for "Red Pony" and Kilbey as vocalist for "Wide Open Road". In April 2010, The Triffids reunited for performances in London with various guest vocalists in place of David McComb, Dev Hynes, Harvey, Snarski, Simon Breed and Tindersticks' Stuart Staples.

In July 2011 Birt released a solo four-track EP, Still Life. Joining Birt on the EP were Casey and MacDonald with Adrian Hoffman (The Morning Light), guesting on individual tracks were Rob McComb and Lee. Birt designed the cover, with Pippa Hurst, and the lino cut was provided by Oscar MacDonald. Birt and MacDonald toured Australia in July 2011. In November and December that year another The Triffids reunion series, including an appearance at the Queenscliff Music Festival, had guest vocals from Harvey and Breed.

On 21 April 2012 Birt released her debut solo album, Render & Prosper. All nine songs were written by Birt, together with one a collaboration with MacDonald. Similar to her EP, MacDonald, Casey and Hoffman all both perform on the album with appearances by Graham Lee, Robert McComb and Ricky Maymi (Brian Jonestown Massacre). In May 2012 Birt and McDonald performed tracks from her debut solo album in Newtown.

== Discography ==
=== Albums ===
- Render & Prosper - Independent (21 April 2012)

=== EPs ===
- Still Life - Independent (July 2011)
