= The Triffids =

Australian alternative rock and pop band

- Also known as: Lawson Square Infirmary
- Origin: Perth, Western Australia, Australia
- Genres: Indie rock, alternative rock, folk rock
- Years active: 1978–1989
- Labels: Hot, Rough Trade, Island, Mushroom
- Past members: see members list below
- Website: Official website

The Triffids were an Australian alternative rock and pop band, formed in Perth, Western Australia, in 1978, with David McComb as singer-songwriter, guitarist, bass guitarist and keyboardist. They achieved some success in Australia, but greater success in the UK and Scandinavia in the 1980s before disbanding in 1989. Their best-known songs include "Wide Open Road" (February 1986) and "Bury Me Deep in Love" (October 1987). SBS television featured their 1986 album, Born Sandy Devotional, on the Great Australian Albums series in 2007, and in 2010 it ranked 5th in the book The 100 Best Australian Albums by Toby Creswell, Craig Mathieson and John O'Donnell.

According to music historian Ian McFarlane, "The Triffids remain one of Australia's best-loved, post-punk groups ... McComb ... infused his melancholy songs with stark yet beautiful and uniquely Australian imagery. Few songwriters managed to capture the feeling of isolation and fatalistic sense of despair of the Australian countryside."

== History ==
=== Formation and early years (1976–1981) ===
In 1976 in Perth, high school students David McComb on acoustic and bass guitars and vocals and Alan "Alsy" MacDonald on drums and vocals, formed Dalsy as a multimedia project, making music, books and photographs. They wrote and performed songs with Phil Kakulas on guitars and vocals (all three later in the Blackeyed Susans), then soon became Blök Musik and Logic (for a day). In May 1978, they became the Triffids, taking their name from the post-apocalyptic novel by John Wyndham, The Day of the Triffids. They were soon joined by Andrew McGowan on guitar and Julian Douglas-Smith on piano. When Byron Sinclair joined on bass guitar in September, McComb switched to rhythm guitar. The Triffids began partly in response to the punk rock movement. Writing in his diary as a teenager, McComb traced the band's emergence in Perth:

On the night of 27 November 1976, a tape was made by Alsy MacDonald, playing a single toy drum, and Dave McComb playing acoustic guitar. The multimedia group 'Dalsy' had come into being. Dalsy went on to make several remarkable tapes (mainly of original material): The Loft Tapes, Rock 'n' Roll Accountancy, Live at Ding Dongs, Bored Kids, Domestic Cosmos, People Are Strange Dalsy Are Stranger, Steve's and the seminal punk work, Pale Horse Have a Fit ... Dalsy did paintings, sculptures and poetry, and wrote a book named "Lunch". They were tinny and quirky, obsessive and manic, versatile and productive. They were also immensely unpopular ... The members of Dalsy grew to hate their audience. They still do, and this hate is an integral part of their music. Dalsy split up towards the end of 1977 ... They launched into 1978 as Blok Musik, with their famous Blok Musik tape ... In April, they played at the Leederville Town Hall Punk Fest, alongside Perth's punk rock contingent but, as usual, no one danced. After that they went home and metamorphosised into Logic. Within a day they changed their minds, and metamorphosised into the Triffids.

Between 1978 and 1981, McComb wrote over 100 original songs and the Triffids had recorded and independently released six cassette tapes, simply called, 1st (1978), 2nd (1978), 3rd (1979), 4th (1979), Tape 5 (1980) and Sixth (1981) (see List of The Triffids Cassettes). By 1979, Kakulas and Sinclair had left and were replaced by David's older brother, Robert McComb on violin and guitar, and Will Akers on bass guitar, and in 1980 Margaret Gillard joined on keyboards. At year's end, the band won a song competition run by the Western Australian Institute of Technology (now Curtin University) Student Guild's radio show on 6NR (now Curtin FM), and in July 1981 they released their first single, "Stand Up", on the Shake Some Action label. MacDonald had briefly left the band for two months, and the single was recorded with Mark Peters as drummer.

=== Early recordings (1982–1984) ===
Gillard and Akers left in February 1982 and were replaced by Jill Yates on keyboards and a returning Sinclair. April saw the release of Reverie, a four-track EP on Resonant Records. Around this time, due to the small population/market in Perth, the band started the long journey driving from Perth to Sydney, then Melbourne (and back again) to play shows, do some recording and to live for large periods of time, often in quite squalid conditions. By mid-year Sinclair had left again, and Martyn P. Casey joined the band on bass guitar in September 1982. For $150 a night, The Triffids' services as a support act were procured by The Reels, The Sunnyboys, The Church, Hunters & Collectors or Uncanny X-Men.

As a four-piece — Casey, David and Robert McComb and MacDonald — they signed to Mushroom Records' White Label in Melbourne and released a single, "Spanish Blue", in October 1982 and the Bad Timing and Other Stories EP in March 1983. By then, back in Sydney again, Jill Birt had joined on piano, organ and vocals. Soon after the release of Bad Timing and Other Stories, Mushroom Records let the band go. They signed with new Australian independent label Hot Records, which brought the independent scene some much needed cohesion. The Triffids were one of the bands leading Hot's drive into overseas markets, which partly led to the label's demise. The Triffids' debut album, Treeless Plain, released in November 1983, was critically acclaimed — described as a "magnificent, muscular piece of work that pounds out simple powerful rock songs — one of the best indie rock albums of its day" — but no singles were released from it. All tracks for Treeless Plain were recorded over twelve midnight-to-dawn sessions at Emerald City Studios, Sydney, in August and September 1983 with The Triffids producing. Their next single, "Beautiful Waste", appeared in February 1984 and was followed by the Raining Pleasure 12" EP in July—the title track, "Raining Pleasure", featured Birt on lead vocals and was cowritten by David McComb with Sydney musician James Paterson (JFK & the Cuban Crisis). Another track, "St. James Infirmary", is a traditional blues folksong, with their version preferred by Australian rock music journalist Toby Creswell in his book, 1001 Songs.

The Triffids, without Birt, recorded Lawson Square Infirmary at the Sydney Opera House, where they worked with Paterson on vocals, guitar, mandolin and piano; Graham Lee (John Kennedy's Love Gone Wrong and in Eric Bogle's backing band) on vocals, dobro and pedal steel guitar; and Daubney Carshott (a.k.a. Martyn Casey) on bass guitar. The six-track country music-style EP was issued by Hot Records in October under the band name, Lawson Square Infirmary. Lee recalled:

I taught primary school, travelled and ended up in Sydney, where I met the Triffids and first sat behind a pedal steel (in that order actually) [...] I met Dave [McComb] through James Paterson, who played in a band in Sydney called JFK and the Cuban Crisis. My initial impressions of Dave were: slightly eccentric, driven, something of a perfectionist, very intelligent.

By mid-1984, The Triffids had spent so much time travelling the 3,972 km (2,468 mi) between Perth in the west and Sydney on the east coast of Australia — David McComb estimated that they made this trip between 12 and 16 times — that they decided to travel that little bit further and headed to Europe.

=== UK and Europe (1984–1989) ===
In late August 1984, the band relocated to London, where Treeless Plain and Raining Pleasure had been issued by Rough Trade Records to critical acclaim. With little savings and five return plane tickets due to expire by Christmas, they gave themselves three months to make inroads in the UK. For their London debut they supported Rough Trade labelmates The Monochrome Set. Success was confirmed when they graced the January 1985 cover of the influential UK magazine NME, which predicted it would be 'The Year of The Triffids'.

In November 1984, they recorded Field of Glass, a three track 12" EP. Performed mostly live in BBC Studio 5 in London, it was released in February 1985. The title track, "Field of Glass", was not released on CD as the master tape could not be found—it was eventually discovered under David McComb's bed. In early 1985, the band acquired their final permanent member, Lee, who had performed on the mini-album Lawson Square Infirmary. Together the six-piece—Birt, Casey, Lee, MacDonald, David & Robert McComb—recorded a 12" EP You Don’t Miss Your Water. The A-side is a countrified version of William Bell's "You Don't Miss Your Water", which was released in August by Hot Records, but by then they were already back in London.

During 1985, the Triffids toured Europe, they were praised by the European press and played stadiums supporting Echo & the Bunnymen. A grass roots following developed as they toured western European countries, finding pockets of popularity in the Netherlands, Greece, Scandinavia, Ireland and Belgium. The band toured as part of the Summer Eurofestival circuit, performing at Glastonbury, Waterpop, Seinäjoki, Roskilde (40,000), T&W Belgium (35,000) and den Haag's Parkpop (pushing 100,000).

Unable to raise a major record deal and with low finances, Born Sandy Devotional was recorded in London in August 1985 with Gil Norton producing (who has also worked with Echo & the Bunnymen), and was released in March 1986. According to Ian McFarlane, Australian rock music historian, "[It] was full of some of the most lonely, spacious songs ever written, and it remains one of the best Australian albums of the 1980s." In 2007, the album was featured by SBS Television on the Great Australian Albums series. The band issued two versions of the "Wide Open Road" single—both a 7" and a 12" version. Born Sandy Devotional reached # 27 on the UK albums chart, and "Wide Open Road" peaked at No. 26 on the UK singles charts but only reached No. 64 on the Australian Kent Music Report Singles Chart. Creswell stated that "Wide Open Road" was "an angry song that finds the cost of freedom is aloneness" in his book, 1001 Songs. In May 2001, the Australasian Performing Right Association (APRA), as part of its 75th Anniversary celebrations, named it one of their Top 30 Australian songs of all time.

Their critical success in the UK boosted their profile back in Australia where they recorded In the Pines in early 1986, while awaiting the release of Born Sandy Devotional, which eventuated in March. In The Pines was recorded at the McCombs' family property in Ravensthorpe, 600 km (370 mi) south east of Perth, in a shearing shed on basic eight-track equipment. It was issued in January 1987 and took The Triffids deeper into folk and country music, with a lo-fi sensibility reminiscent of Bob Dylan's Basement Tapes. The band backed Scottish musician Bill Drummond for his 1986 solo album The Man. The Triffids toured UK later in the year.

From 26 December 1986 to 26 January 1987, the Triffids were on the bill of the Australian Made tour, which was the largest touring festival of Australian music talent attempted to that point. Jimmy Barnes and INXS headlined, and the rest of the line-up featured Mental As Anything, Divinyls, Models, the Saints, and I'm Talking. A concert film, Australian Made: The Movie, was directed by Richard Lowenstein and released later that year. The lead singer of INXS, Michael Hutchence, had insisted on the Triffids being part of the bill. 1987 also saw the release of three tracks recorded for John Peel on 5 May 1985, The Peel Sessions.

The Triffids were courted by several UK major record labels, based on the success of Born Sandy Devotional, eventually signing a three-record contract with Island Records in the UK in November 1986. Between April and August 1987, the band worked again with Norton, to record Calenture, their Island Records debut. The album, released in February 1988, saw them explore themes of insanity, deception and rootlessness—the title refers to a fever suffered by sailors during long hot voyages. The Triffids were nomadic, travelling back and forth from Australia to England to record the 'difficult' album—initial recordings with US producer Craig Leon were abandoned—and obviously related to the disoriented sailors. It provided the singles "Bury Me Deep in Love" in October 1987 and "Trick of the Light" in January 1988.

After Born Sandy Devotional, they graduated to the festival circuit and played alongside Iggy Pop, the Ramones, the Fall, Anthrax and Echo & the Bunnymen. By 1988, their fame was such that NME invited them to contribute a cover version of the Beatles' song "Good Morning Good Morning" to a tribute album, Sgt. Pepper Knew My Father, alongside songs by Billy Bragg and Wet Wet Wet.

The Triffids wanted to record the next album in Australia, but after the Calenture experience Island wanted to keep the band nearby. The Black Swan was recorded between September and October 1988 in Somerset, UK, and produced and engineered by Stephen Street. It was well received by critics, but was not a commercial success, which disappointed band members. That, together with being tired from the constant travelling and touring, led to The Triffids being dissolved. The group travelled to the US in 1989 for a pair of New York dates before taking a much-needed vacation – one which turned permanent:

We didn't know they were final performances. Dave wanted to do a solo album and we were due to get back together after that. Much to his chagrin his solo album took longer than expected and he kept writing songs that sounded like Triffids songs. Domesticity snuck up on most of us, poor health snuck up on Dave, a planned '94 reunion tour was put on hold, and the Triffids faded into the mist. – Graham Lee

The band's last Australian shows were towards the end of 1989, with the final at the Australian National University in Canberra on 14 August 1989. 1990 saw the release of the live album, Stockholm, which completed their contractual obligations with Island.

=== Breakup and aftermath ===
Following the breakup of the band, Alsy MacDonald, Jill Birt and Robert McComb took "proper jobs" as a lawyer (currently with the Equal Opportunity Commission), architect and teacher respectively, with MacDonald and Birt marrying (Robert McComb currently teaches at Melbourne High School). David McComb and Lee continued to be involved with The Blackeyed Susans, a group David McComb formed as a side band during an earlier Triffids' summer tour of Australia. Martyn Casey briefly joined the Blackeyed Susans and then became a permanent member of Nick Cave and the Bad Seeds in April 1990.

In 1990, David McComb moved back to London with the aim of pursuing his solo career. Since sustaining crushed vertebrae in the UK in 1986 McComb had suffered chronic and severe back pain that plagued him till his death. In 1992, after no success, he returned to Australia to make some solo recordings for Mushroom Records (featuring both Casey and Lee), releasing just one solo album, Love of Will, in 1994. He also worked with many other musicians on various projects, including assembling a band, the Red Ponies, to tour Europe. In June 1993 three former members of The Triffids: David McComb, Robert McComb and Lee; as well as Charlie Owen and Chris Wilson guested on Acuff's Rose's debut studio album, Never Comin' Down. Another project, costar, was formed when David moved to Melbourne, but due to his ill health they only played sporadically around Melbourne, although recordings had begun and a single was ready for a limited release.

Following the Red Ponies tour David McComb suffered substance abuse-related health problems, which ultimately resulted in him undergoing a heart transplant in 1996. Despite the exacerbation of his back problem from the transplant procedure he embarked on a university course and his prolific output of songs continued. He recorded 7 demos at the studio of Julian Wu, a long time supporter with old friends Martin Casey, Mick Harvey, Warren Ellis, Kiernan Box and Stuart Solar on drums. Forming 'costar' with Graham Lee, Kiernan Box on piano, Stuart Soler on drums Will Akers on bass and Matt Habbin on saxophone. Ill health limited live performances but writing, arranging and other literary projects continued at a furious pace. Following a car accident in Melbourne, he was admitted to St Vincent's hospital. Three days later he died at home, on 2 February 1999, a few days short of his 37th birthday.

In February 2000, after the State Coroner of Victoria published his findings, The West Australian newspaper wrote: "[Coroner] Johnstone said McComb's mental and physical condition had deteriorated after his (car) accident but his death was due to heroin toxicity and mild acute rejection of his 1996 heart transplant."

=== 2006 onwards ===
The Triffids back catalogue began being reissued in 2006. Graham Lee has taken on the role of guardian of David McComb's musical legacy. The Domino label in the UK is handling the reissues in Europe, while Liberation Music deals with Australia and New Zealand. An extended version of fan favourite Born Sandy Devotional came first, with staggered release dates in Europe, Australasia and North America between June and July 2006. A joint release of In the Pines and Calenture followed in February 2007. In the Pines was given a full remix by Bruce Callaway, the original engineer, who had been looking after the master tapes for 20 years. The album was also extended with a number of tracks that were recorded during the sessions for In The Pines but held over for inclusion on Calenture because, in David McComb's words, "we have to keep something good for later." (In The Pines was essentially a low-budget 'holiday' album, recorded while the band was still looking for a deal with one of the major labels.) Calenture was extended with B-sides from the same period, and with a second disc of demo recordings for the album. A re-release of the last Triffids album The Black Swan with an extra disc of rarities and demos have, so far, ended the reissue programme. In 2010 the best-of album Come Ride With Me... Wide Open Road was released. A limited edition of this, called Come Ride With Me... Wide Open Road – The Deluxe Edition, contained nine discs of bonus material, including early demos, tracks previously available on cassette only and full-length live recordings. Later stages of the re-issue programme is said to include further rarities, extended liner notes, remastering, a DVD and a live album. There is, currently, a selection of free downloads available on the official site, overseen by Lee.

David McComb was posthumously inducted into the WAM (West Australian Music Industry Association) Hall of Fame as a composer on 21 February 2006.

In June 2006, in conjunction with the re-issue of Born Sandy Devotional, the band re-formed to play three live performances, two concerts in Hasselt, Belgium, and one in Amsterdam, the Netherlands, with guest vocalists (including Mark Snarski (The Jackson Code) and Belgian Harald Vanherf (The Hoodoo Club / Wicona Airbag) replacing David McComb. A huge collection of band memorabilia was also displayed, along with the airing of a Triffids concert film and question-and-answer sessions with the band members. According to Lee the experience was, "more than I could have hoped for – a true celebration of the music, and an intensity from band and audience that I've rarely felt." The five remaining members of The Triffids gave a series of performances on 17–20 January 2008, as part of the 2008 Sydney Festival celebrating the music and the memory of David McComb. The band were joined on stage by a number of Australian musicians including Mark and Rob Snarski (The Blackeyed Susans), Toby Martin (Youth Group), Steve Kilbey (The Church), Mick Harvey (Nick Cave and the Bad Seeds), J.P. Shilo, Chris Abrahams (The Necks) and Melanie Oxley. Youth Group in fact opened these shows with 4 covers of Early Triffids classics and rarities in praise of band's earlier years. A feature-length documentary of these shows, It's Raining Pleasure, was to be released in early 2009.

In May 2008, Liberation Music continued with the reissuing of The Triffids' back catalogue, with the release of The Black Swan, which includes five songs which had previously been left off the album at the time of its initial release, together with an encore. The album had originally been envisaged by David McComb as a double album. The re-released album also included a bonus disc of demos and unreleased material. Also released was Treeless Plain which was re-mixed by the original sound engineer, Nick Mansbridge. The last of the re-releases was a collection of songs from various EPs, Raining Pleasure, Lawson Square Infirmary and Field of Glass, under the title Beautiful Waste and Other Songs (Mini-Masterpieces 1983–1985). The compilation album also includes the title song, "Beautiful Waste", together with "Dear Miss Lonelyhearts" and "Native Bride".

The Triffids repeated their 2008 Sydney performances, 'A Secret in the Shape of a Song', at the Arts Centre Melbourne on 29 January 2009 and at the Perth International Arts Festival on 20–22 February 2009. The shows included guest appearances by Mick Harvey (Nick Cave and the Bad Seeds), J.P. Shilo, Melanie Oxley, Mark and Rob Snarski (The Blackeyed Susans), Steve Kilbey (The Church), Alex Archer and Brendon Humphries (The Kill Devil Hills), Ricky Maymi (The Brian Jonestown Massacre), and Toby Martin (Youth Group) on stage with the remaining members of the band. After the Perth performances video artists VJzoo showed a selection of David McComb's personal photographs live on screen to a soundtrack compiled from his mixtape collection. 'The Triffids and Friends' is a loose collective of some of the aforementioned musicians with remaining Triffids members. Youth Group once again reprised their renditions of early Triffids songs at these shows. Performances by the band along with The Church and Ed Keupper were scheduled for late 2011 in Perth.

== Honours ==
=== ARIA Awards ===
The ARIA Music Awards is an annual awards ceremony that recognises excellence, innovation, and achievement across all genres of Australian music. They commenced in 1987. In 2008, The Triffids were inducted into the ARIA Hall of Fame. Upon the announcement Graham Lee commented that David McComb would find the accolade ironic, given that the band were hardly superstars in their home country, but would have appreciated the belated recognition.

Year	Nominee / work	Award	Result
2008	The Triffids	ARIA Hall of Fame	inductee

=== West Australian Music Industry Awards ===
The West Australian Music Industry Awards are annual awards celebrating achievements for Western Australian music. They commenced in 1985.

Year	Nominee / work	Award	Result
2016	The Triffids	Hall of Fame	inductee

=== Legacy ===
One of the most critically acclaimed bands from Greece, Raining Pleasure, took their name from the song "Raining Pleasure" by The Triffids. Melbourne-based acoustic rock group The Paradise Motel are frequently likened to the work of The Triffids whose work they have covered.

In 2009, Australian scholars Chris Coughran and Niall Lucy's rock biography on The Triffids, Vagabond Holes: David McComb and the Triffids, was published by Fremantle Press, and includes contributions by Mick Harvey, Nick Cave, John Kinsella, DBC Pierre and Judith Lucy. Bleddyn Butcher's biography of David McComb, Save What You Can: The Day of The Triffids, was published by Treadwater Press, Sydney, in November 2011. In December 2020, The Triffids were listed at number 43 in Rolling Stone Australia's "50 Greatest Australian Artists of All Time" issue.

== Members ==
- Will Akers – bass (1980–1982)
- Jill Birt – keyboards, vocals (1983–1989)
- Martyn Casey – bass (1982–1989)
- Simon Cromack – percussion (1982–1983)
- Margaret Gillard – keyboards (1979–1982)
- Phil Kakulas – guitar, vocals (1978–1979)
- Graham Lee – guitar, pedal steel, lap-steel, vocals (1985–1989)
- Allan MacDonald – drums, percussion, vocals (1978–1980, 1982–1989)
- David McComb – vocals, guitar, piano, bass (1978–1989; died 1999)
- Robert McComb – violins, guitar, keyboards, percussion, vocals (1979–1989)
- Mark Peters – drums (1980–1981)
- Byron Sinclair – bass (1978–1979, 1982)
- Jill Yates – keyboards (1982)

== Discography ==
Studio albums

- Treeless Plain (1983)
- Born Sandy Devotional (1986)
- In the Pines (1986)
- Calenture (1987)
- The Black Swan (1989)
