= David McComb =

Australian musician

Background information
- Born: David Richard McComb; 17 February 1962; Perth, Western Australia
- Died: 2 February 1999 (aged 36) Melbourne, Victoria, Australia
- Genre: Rock
- Occupations: Musician, songwriter, guitarist, singer
- Years active: 1976–1999

David Richard McComb (17 February 1962 – 2 February 1999) was an Australian musician. He was the singer-songwriter and guitarist of the Australian bands, The Triffids (1976–89) and The Blackeyed Susans (1989–93). He also had a solo career including leading David McComb and The Red Ponies.

Over his career McComb had bouts of alcoholism, and amphetamine and heroin abuse. He developed cardiomyopathy and in 1996 underwent a heart transplant. David McComb died on 2 February 1999 "due to heroin toxicity and mild acute rejection of his 1996 heart transplant", according to the coroner.

In May 2001, the Australasian Performing Right Association (APRA), as part of its 75th Anniversary celebrations, named "Wide Open Road" by The Triffids – written by McComb – as one of the Top 30 Australian songs of all time. On 1 July 2008 The Triffids were inducted into the ARIA Hall of Fame with McComb's contribution acknowledged by a tribute performance.

== Biography ==
=== Early years in Perth ===
David McComb was born in Perth, Western Australia, on 17 February 1962, the youngest of four boys. His parents were both doctors, his father, Harold McComb, a plastic surgeon and his mother, Athel Hockey (AO), a paediatrician and later the head of the Genetics Department at the University of West Australia. The family resided in a historical residence, The Cliffe in McNeil Street, Peppermint Grove. All the boys attended Christ Church Grammar School in Claremont, Western Australia, with David winning prizes in English Literature and Divinity. McComb studied journalism and literature at the Western Australian Institute of Technology. His older brother, Robert McComb, later joined The Triffids as a guitarist.

=== The Triffids 1976–1989 ===
While still at high school, partly in response to the emergence of punk rock, McComb and Alan "Alsy" MacDonald formed Dalsy (a multimedia project, producing music, books and photographic work, and its output reflected his early interests, in Bob Dylan, Leonard Cohen, the Velvet Underground and Patti Smith), in 1976. Dalsy, later known as Blök Music then evolved into The Triffids (from the post-apocalyptic John Wyndham novel, The Day of the Triffids). McComb and MacDonald wrote and performed songs with Phil Kakulas (later in Blackeyed Susans), Andrew McGowan, Julian Douglas-Smith, and later Byron Sinclair, Will Akers and Margaret Gillard. By Christmas 1978, they had released several home-recorded cassette tapes and been through many line-up changes. McComb became established as the band's main songwriter and common denominator in the band's various line-ups.

In 1980, The Triffids won a band demo competition and released their first 7-inch vinyl single, "Stand Up", on the Shake Some Action label in the following year. The Triffids then moved to Melbourne before eventually settling in Sydney in 1982. After a couple of singles and EPs, Reverie EP, "Spanish Blue", and the Bad Timing and Other Stories EP, the group had saved up money from support slots with the Hoodoo Gurus, The Church and Hunters and Collectors, to record and release the band's debut 12-inch vinyl album, Treeless Plain, for Hot Records, a Sydney independent label.

McComb sold the rights to three songs to ABC-TV, for their 1984 series Sweet and Sour: "On The Street Where You Live", "Digging a Hole", and "Too Hot To Move". Lead vocals on the first two were sung for the series by Cathy McQuade (of Deckchairs Overboard) and the latter was performed by Deborah Conway (of Do-Ré-Mi). As part of the sale, The Triffids were no longer able to perform the songs. McComb later said that he regretted selling the songs and that he had bought back "Too Hot to Move", which The Triffids began to perform again: they recorded it for their 1989 album, The Black Swan. It has also been performed by The Blackeyed Susans (with Rob Snarski on lead vocals).

In 1985, The Triffids moved to London, with the addition of 'Evil' Graham Lee on pedal steel guitar, recorded their second album, Born Sandy Devotional in 1986, and Wide Open Road EP. The group were hailed by the British media, were featured on the John Peel show and supported Echo & the Bunnymen.

In 1986, with delays in releasing Born Sandy Devotional, the Triffids returned to Western Australia where they built an eight-track machine inside a shearing shed on the McComb family's farming property and recorded their third album In The Pines. On their return to the UK, they signed a three-record deal with Island Records. In 1987 armed with the considerable budget of £125,000, and the production skills of Gil Norton, David McComb and a new recruit, Adam Peters, concocted the lush orchestrations of the poignant "Bury Me Deep in Love" and the melancholic wide-screen atmosphere of the subsequent Calenture album. Despite the release of another two tracks from the album as singles, "Trick of the Light" and "Holy Water", Calenture didn't have the impact expected of it. In 1989, the "Goodbye Little Boy" single featured in the Australian soap opera Neighbours. 1989 also saw the Triffids record their last studio album, The Black Swan, in England, with producer Stephen Street. Despite being well received, the album wasn't an overwhelming success, which disappointed McComb and the rest of the band to the point where they decided to dissolve the band. To fulfil their contractual obligations with Island Records a live album recorded in Stockholm, Stockholm was released in 1990 the year after the Triffids split up.

=== Post-Triffids career 1990–1999 ===
McComb lived in London in 1990–1992 with his girlfriend, and launched a solo career. In 1991, McComb and Adam Peters contributed to the Leonard Cohen tribute album I'm Your Fan with a cover of "Don't Go Home With Your Hard-On", later mentioned favorably by Cohen himself. Following this, McComb formed the first incarnation of the Red Ponies and played three London shows in quick succession, at the Powerhaus, Subterranea and the Borderline. The line-up consisted of McComb and Peters along with Nick Allum of Fatima Mansions, who also had played drums on Calenture, Gary Sanford of Aztec Camera, and Martyn P. Casey.

When he returned to Australia, McComb settled in Melbourne, where he commenced studies at the University of Melbourne in art history. He recorded with the Blackeyed Susans, completed a solo album, Love of Will, for Mushroom Records, and undertook a solo tour of Europe with his backing band, The Red Ponies, consisting of Graham Lee, Warren Ellis, Peter Luscombe, Bruce Haymes and Michael Vidale. In June 1993 three former members of The Triffids: McComb, Robert and Lee; as well as Charlie Owen and Chris Wilson guested on Acuff's Rose's debut studio album, Never Comin' Down.

He also performed in Australia with his last band, Costar, who recorded a three-track EP. (This has never been released, but may be released on the W.Minc label when the Triffids reissue program is complete.) Recording for a Costar album was also underway at the time of McComb's death. McComb made occasional appearances with the Blackeyed Susans in Australia, giving Rob Snarski a break from vocals (as did Kim Salmon).

=== Health problems and death ===
McComb suffered from back pain which worsened over the years. He also struggled with alcoholism, and amphetamine and heroin abuse, which greatly affected his health. He developed cardiomyopathy, a heart condition that, when found in young men, is most commonly caused by alcoholism. In 1996, he underwent a successful heart transplant, but continued his drinking and drug use. In January 1999 he was driving a car which was involved in a collision. He was hospitalised overnight and released with bruising. A few days later he died at home, on 2 February 1999 just before his 37th birthday. In February 2000, after the State Coroner of Victoria finally published his findings, The West Australian newspaper wrote: "Mr Johnstone [the Coroner] said McComb's mental and physical condition had deteriorated after his accident but his death was due to heroin toxicity and mild acute rejection of his 1996 heart transplant."

His ashes were spread under the pine trees at the family farm (Woodstock) at Jerdacuttup, approximately 22 kilometres (14 mi) north of Hopetoun, Western Australia.

== Legacy and influence ==
In 2001 the Australasian Performing Right Association (APRA), as part of its 75th Anniversary celebrations, named his 1986 composition "Wide Open Road" as one of the thirty greatest Australian songs of all time.

On 21 February 2006 David McComb was posthumously inducted into the West Australian Music Industry Association Hall of Fame, as a composer.

In June 2006, his work with The Triffids was reissued in remastered and extended form on the Domino label, commencing with Born Sandy Devotional. McComb's work is held in high regard in Europe, to the extent that The Triffids reformed and travelled from Australia to play live performances in Belgium and the Netherlands, in July 2006, with guest vocalists replacing McComb. The band also played four consecutive nights in Sydney in January 2008 with many guest singers and musicians, including Mick Harvey, Rob Snarski and Melanie Oxley. These performances were released as a DVD (It's Raining Pleasure) in late 2009. On 1 July 2008 The Triffids were inducted into the ARIA Hall of Fame with McComb's contribution acknowledge by a tribute performance.

In September 2009, "Vagabond Holes: David McComb & The Triffids" – edited by Chris Coughran and Niall Lucy, and featuring contributions from Nick Cave, DBC Pierre, Laurie Duggan, John Kinsella, Bleddyn Butcher, Steve Kilbey, Robert Forster, "Handsome" Steve Miller and others – was published by Fremantle Press.

A feature-length documentary about McComb, entitled Love in Bright Landscapes: The Story of David McComb of the Triffids, commenced shooting in January 2008, produced by Atticus Media and the Acme Film Company. On January 29, 2009, "A Secret In The Shape of A Song" 3-hour tribute concert took place at Hamer Hall in Melbourne, with much of the same line up as previous tributes. Over the next few days, The Triffids along with Steve Kilby and Mick Harvey, also opened two Leonard Cohen concerts with Paul Kelly, in Hunter Valley and Bowral. In late 2009, a live tribute album entitled Deep in a Dream: An Evening with the Songs of David McComb, featuring The Blackeyed Susans and other Melbourne-based acts, was issued by the filmmakers to help fund the ongoing production of the documentary, which was released theatrically and then to disc and streaming formats in 2021/22 via Label Distribution.

In 2009 a collection of David McComb's poems, titled Beautiful Waste: Poems by David McComb, was published by Fremantle Press. The anthology was edited by Chris Coughran and Niall Lucy, and includes an introduction by poet John Kinsella.

In 2020 an album of cover versions of McComb's unreleased songs was released under the name of The Friends Of David McComb. It featured artists including Frente!'s Angie Hart.

== Discography ==
=== Solo releases ===
LPs

- 1994 Love of Will (White Label Records)

EPs

- 1989 "I Don't Need You" (with Adam Peters) (Island Records)
- 1991 "The Message" (The Foundation Label)
- 1994 "Setting You Free" (White Label Records)
- 1994 "I Want To Conquer You" (White Label Records)
- 1994 "Clear Out My Mind" (White Label Records)

Compilations, Various Artists (contributor)

- 1988 Til Things Are Brighter: A Tribute To Johnny Cash (Rhino Records) – "Country Boy"
- 1991 I'm Your Fan: The Songs Of Leonard Cohen (Columbia Records) – "Don't Go Home With Your Hard On"
- 1996 Where Joy Kills Sorrow (W.Minc Records) – "Still Alive And Well"

Guest vocals

- 1996 Four Hours Sleep More of Her (Mushroom Records) – "This Song Can Save You" and "When I First Met You"

== Awards ==
=== West Australian Music Industry Awards ===
The West Australian Music Industry Awards are annual awards celebrating achievements for Western Australian music. They commenced in 1985.

Year	Nominee / work	Award	Result
2006	David McComb	Hall of Fame	inductee
