= Martyn P. Casey =

Australian bassist (born 1960)

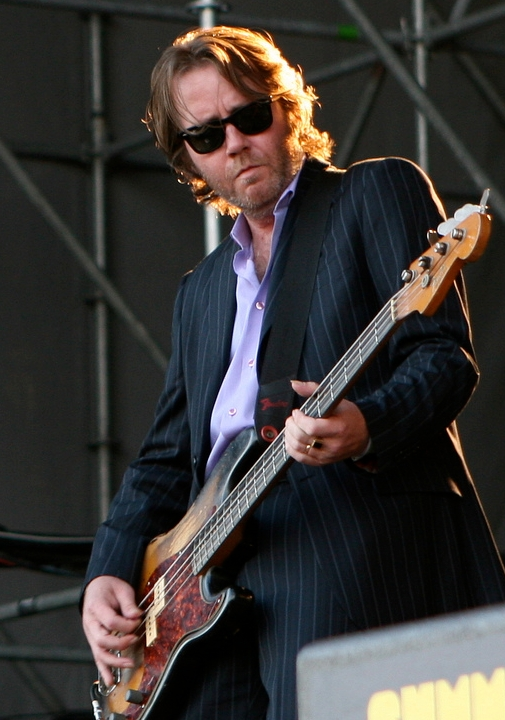
- Casey performing in July 2008

Background information
- Also known as: Daubney Carshott
- Born: Martyn Paul Casey; 10 July 1960 (age 66); Chesterfield, Derbyshire, England
- Origin: Melbourne, Victoria, Australia
- Genres: Alternative rock, experimental rock, folk rock, garage rock
- Occupations: Musician, composer
- Instruments: Bass, guitar, vocals
- Years active: 1982–present
- Labels: Hot, Island, Mute
- Website: www.martynpcasey.com

Martyn Paul Casey (born 10 July 1960) is an English-born Australian rock bass guitarist. He has been a member of the Triffids, Nick Cave and the Bad Seeds and Grinderman. Casey plays either his Fender Precision Bass or Fender Jazz Bass.

== Biography ==
Martyn Paul Casey was born in Chesterfield, Derbyshire, England on 10 July 1960 and has a twin brother Mark. Casey's original band, the Nobodies, was formed in February 1980, with Matthew Stirling (Matthew de la Hunty, later of Tall Tales and True) on guitar and Steve Eskine on drums (this line-up of the band released a cassette of their recordings). In early 1981 he left the Nobodies and played in a reggae band, A2Z. He lives in Fremantle, Australia, with his wife and children where he plays with the Painkillers.

== Career ==
=== The Triffids ===
Casey joined the Triffids in September 1982 replacing bassist Byron Sinclair. With the band, he recorded their second EP, Bad Timing and Other Stories in October. It was issued by Mushroom Records in April 1983. Mushroom let the band go shortly after its release. The group saved money from support slots with the Hoodoo Gurus, the Church and Hunters and Collectors, to record and release their debut 12-inch vinyl album, Treeless Plain, for Hot Records, a newly established Sydney-based independent label.

In late 1984, The Triffids moved to London, and recorded the EP Field of Glass. The band's line-up stabilised with the addition of 'Evil' Graham Lee on pedal steel guitar. In August 1985, they recorded their second album, Born Sandy Devotional, with Gil Norton (Echo & the Bunnymen). The group were hailed by the British media, were featured on the John Peel show and supported Echo & the Bunnymen.

In 1986, with delays in issuing Born Sandy Devotional, the Triffids returned to Western Australia where they built an eight-track machine inside a shearing shed on the McComb family's farming property and recorded their third album In the Pines. Born Sandy Devotional was eventually released in March 1986, it reached #27 on the UK charts and #64 in Australia. On their return to the UK, they signed a three-record deal with Island Records. In 1987, with a budget of £125,000, and the production skills of Gil Norton, David McComb and a new recruit, Adam Peters, worked on "Bury Me Deep in Love" and the subsequent Calenture album. Despite the release of another two tracks from the album as singles, "Trick of the Light" and "Holy Water", Calenture did not have the commercial impact expected.

In 1989, the "Goodbye Little Boy" single featured in the Australian TV soap opera Neighbours. 1989 also saw The Triffids record their last studio album, The Black Swan in England, with producer Stephen Street. Despite being well received, the album was commercially unsuccessful, leading to the dissolution of the band. To fulfill their contractual obligations with Island Records, a live album recorded in Stockholm, Stockholm, was released in 1990 the year after The Triffids had split up.

Casey, also an artist, provided a substantial amount of the art work for the 2009 rock biography on The Triffids, Vagabond Holes: David McComb and the Triffids, edited by Australian academics Niall Lucy and Chris Coughran, including the book's cover.

=== The Blackeyed Susans ===
In 1989 Casey joined the Bottomless Schooners of Old, made up of McComb on guitar, keyboards and vocals, Lee on pedal steel guitar, Robert Snarski (ex-Chad's Tree) on guitar and vocals, and Ashley Davis on drums. The Bottomless Schooners of Old were a precursor to the Blackeyed Susans He replaced Phil Kakulas who left the Blackeyed Susans for Sydney to play with Martha's Vineyard. Casey however did not appear on any of the band's recorded material and departed shortly after to join Nick Cave and the Bad Seeds.

=== Nick Cave and the Bad Seeds ===
Casey joined Nick Cave and the Bad Seeds on bass in April 1990 while the band was touring to support their record The Good Son. Guitarist Kid Congo Powers quit the Bad Seeds; Mick Harvey switched from bass to guitar and Casey was hired to fill the bassist's role. The lineup of Nick Cave, Harvey, Blixa Bargeld, Conway Savage, Casey and Thomas Wydler then produced the 1992 album Henry's Dream. The next album was Live Seeds, released in September 1993, which reproduced many of the Henry's Dream songs in a gig setting.

The Bad Seeds released Let Love In (April 1994) which contained classic tracks such as "Do You Love Me?", "Red Right Hand", and "Loverman". This was followed by band's biggest commercial success to date, Murder Ballads (February 1996), which was a culmination of Cave's long-time fascination with "the language of violence" and allowed for further experimentation in musical style. Collaborations with Kylie Minogue and PJ Harvey on the singles "Where The Wild Roses Grow" and "Henry Lee" respectively led to mainstream chart success and The Bad Seeds widest exposure yet. This album also saw the addition of two new Bad Seeds, Warren Ellis (Dirty Three) on violin, and Jim Sclavunos on percussion.

March 1997 saw the release of the Bad Seeds' tenth studio album, The Boatman's Call, one of the most critically acclaimed releases by the Bad Seeds. The following year saw the release of The Best of Nick Cave and the Bad Seeds, a collection that spanned the group's entire history. Over the next two years Nick Cave spent working on a variety of projects, with the Bad Seeds going into hiatus.

In 2000 the band entered London's Abbey Road Studios, resulting in the April 2001 release of No More Shall We Part. The next album Nocturama was released in February 2003 to moderate critical success. The fourteenth studio album, Abattoir Blues/The Lyre of Orpheus (September 2004) was a double CD. It was the first album by the band in which Blixa Bargeld did not take part (Bargeld leaving the band to devote more time to Einstürzende Neubauten), drumming duties were split for the two albums, having Thomas Wydler and Jim Sclavunos drum on each CD.

In March 2008, the band released their 14th studio album, Dig, Lazarus, Dig!!!, inspired by the Biblical story of the resurrection of Lazarus of Bethany by Jesus Christ. Casey remained a member of the Bad Seeds for the albums Push the Sky Away (2013), Skeleton Tree (2016), Ghosteen (2019).

Due to illness, Casey did not join the Bad Seeds on their 2024 European tour to promote Wild God, and was temporarily replaced by Colin Greenwood of Radiohead.

=== Grinderman ===
After heavy touring throughout 2005 with The Bad Seeds in support of Abattoir Blues/The Lyre of Orpheus, Nick Cave began writing songs on guitar, an instrument he'd rarely played. His rudimentary playing gave the new material a rawer feel than much of the Bad Seeds' output.

The group entered Metropolis Studios in London to record the original Grinderman demos and it was this material that would eventually become the basis for the band's debut album Grinderman. The album was recorded with producer Nick Launay in April at RAK studios, London and mixed in October at Metropolis Studios.

Grinderman was released in March 2007. The band made their live debut at the All Tomorrow's Parties Festival in Somerset the following month. This was followed by a show at the Forum in London on 20 June. Grinderman opened for the White Stripes at their Madison Square Garden show on 24 July 2007, followed by several of their own American tour dates. The band then embarked on a theatre tour of Australia, opening for a Nick Cave 'solo' set, which consisted of the same band members. The band recorded a second album, Grinderman 2, released in September 2010. The band did a European and North American tour to promote the album's release.

== Discography ==
=== The Blackeyed Susans ===
no recorded output

=== Nick Cave and the Bad Seeds (1990–present) ===
- Studio albums
  - Henry's Dream - Mute Records (1992)
  - Let Love In - Mute Records (1994)
  - Murder Ballads - Mute Records (1996)
  - The Boatman's Call - Mute Records / Reprise Records (1997)
  - No More Shall We Part - Mute Records (2001)
  - Nocturama - Mute Records (2003)
  - Abattoir Blues/The Lyre of Orpheus - Mute Records (2CD) (2004)
  - Dig, Lazarus, Dig!!! - Mute Records (2008)
  - Push the Sky Away - Bad Seed Ltd (2013)
  - Skeleton Tree - Bad Seed Ltd (2016)
  - Ghosteen - Bad Seed Ltd (2019)
- Live albums and compilations
  - Live Seeds - Mute Records (1993)
  - The Best of Nick Cave and the Bad Seeds - Mute Records (1998)
  - B-Sides & Rarities - Mute Records (3CD) (2005)
  - Abattoir Blues Tour - Mute Records (2CD/2DVD)(2007)

=== Grinderman (2006–present) ===
- Grinderman - Mute Records (5 March 2007)
- Grinderman 2 (2010)
