= Graham Lee (musician) =

Australian musician and record producer (born 1953)

- Also known as: 'Evil' Graham Lee
- Born: Graham Francis Lee; 11 December 1953 (age 72); Kenilworth, Queensland, Australia
- Genre: Rock
- Occupations: Musician, guitarist, singer
- Years active: 1983–present

Graham Francis Lee (born 11 December 1953) is an Australian musician and record producer, best known as the steel guitar player of the 1980s band The Triffids, where he was nicknamed 'Evil Graham Lee'.

He was born and raised in Kenilworth, Queensland, and graduated as a Primary School Teacher in Brisbane. Lee left Brisbane in 1980 and went travelling around Asia and Europe for three years. He moved back to Australia in 1983 and settled in Sydney where he met The Triffids. They'd heard his dobro work on Eric Bogle's first album which contained the legendary track, "And The Band Played Waltzing Matilda", and invited him to guest on a demo they were recording at the Sydney Opera House – a recording subsequently released as Lawson Square Infirmary.

The Triffids then returned to London but Lee stayed in Sydney and took up the pedal steel guitar. Work was scarce for everybody but occasionally something good came up – one session was for a young Melbourne singer songwriter called Paul Kelly who was making a record called 'Post'. He also played on the John Kennedy singles Forget / The End of the Affair (Waterfront Records, Sept 1984) and Miracle (In Marrickville) / Two People (Waterfront Records, March 1985).

When The Triffids returned to Sydney early in 1985, they asked Lee to join them full-time. Before the year was out the band moved back to London and this time Lee went too. For nearly five years they enjoyed success in Europe and released a number of records which are recognised as Australian classics – Born Sandy Devotional, The Black Swan and Calenture. However, life in London, the constant touring, and the incomprehensible nature of the record business eventually wore the band down and at the end of 1989 they decided to move back to Australia for a break, which became permanent and the band dissolved.

In 1990 Lee moved to Melbourne and took a room upstairs at the Standard Hotel, in Fitzroy the pub owned by Steve Miller (The Moodists), his old tour manager. Miller, in partnership with Dave Walsh (the brother of Chris Miller, the bass player for the Moodists) establishing an independent record label, W.Minc Records (Walsh Miller Incorporated) in 1994.

During the first few years, after the break-up of The Triffids, Lee was happy to book the bands at the pub and stay focused on music. He produced three of the first four W.Minc records and worked as a session player or a hired hand in various bands, including John Kennedy, The KLF, Blackeyed Susans, The Paradise Vendors, Truckasaurus (with Lisa Miller), David Chesworth, Essendon Airport, GB3, and All India Radio. It wasn't until he was back in Europe, on tour with David McComb's solo outfit, The Red Ponies, that he decided he really wanted to get involved with W.Minc. In 1996 he officially joined the W.Minc Records as the label manager and since then he and Miller have guided the label together.

Lee also currently runs an official website for The Triffids and in June 2006 (in conjunction with the re-issue of Born Sandy Devotional) joined the other members of The Triffids to play three live performances, two concerts in Hasselt, Belgium and one in Amsterdam, Netherlands.

== Albums ==
- 2026: I Think I’m Alone Now (Isle of Jura)
