= Robert McComb =

Australian musician

- Born: Robert Harold McComb; Perth, Western Australia, Australia
- Genres: Rock, alternative rock, folk rock, country
- Occupations: Musician, teacher
- Instruments: Violins, guitar, keyboards, percussion, vocals
- Years active: 1979–1989

Robert Harold McComb is an Australian musician who played guitar, violin, organ, and other instruments with Perth-based rock group The Triffids, from 1979 to 1989. He is the older brother of the band's founder and lead singer-songwriter, David McComb (1962–1999). Both were also members of Lawson Square Infirmary and The Red Ponies.

Subsequently, McComb was a teacher of geography in Melbourne. On 1 July 2008 The Triffids, with McComb and other surviving members, were inducted into the ARIA Hall of Fame.

== Biography ==
Robert Harold McComb was born in Perth, Western Australia as one of four sons. His parents were both doctors, his father, Dr. Harold Keith McComb (born 1924, Brisbane), being a plastic surgeon and his mother, Dr. Kathleen Athel Hockey (AO) (1923–2011), a medical geneticist. Harold was the only son of A. R. McComb of Montreal, Canada and Athel was the youngest daughter of P. R. Hockey of Toorak, Victoria. In 1947 both completed their medical degrees at University of Melbourne and were engaged in July. In 1955 the McCombs moved to Perth, and raised their family in a historical residence, The Cliffe in McNeil Street, Peppermint Grove. All four boys attended Christ Church Grammar School in Claremont. The eldest son, Peter McComb, is also a doctor – in obstetrics and gynaecology – and an associate professor in Vancouver.

In 1979 McComb joined his youngest brother, David Richard McComb in the rock band The Triffids, initially as a guitarist, replacing founder Phil Kakulas. Aside from guitar, McComb also provided violin, keyboards, percussion and backing vocals for The Triffids from 1979 to their disbandment in 1989. From 1990-1991, McComb toured internationally and recorded as a guest guitarist/violinist for Tall Tales and True. In June 1993, three former members of The Triffids: McComb, David and Graham Lee; as well as Charlie Owen and Chris Wilson guested on Acuff's Rose's debut studio album, Never Comin' Down. On 2 February 1999 David McComb died. From 2006, The Triffids, with McComb, have reformed for various performances with different guest lead vocalists. On 1 July 2008 The Triffids, with McComb and other surviving members, were inducted into the ARIA Hall of Fame.

Outside his music career, McComb has been a secondary school teacher of geography in Melbourne and has written advice for Victorian Certificate of Education students. In October 2009, McComb was a guest panellist on Australian Broadcasting Corporation TV pop music quiz show, Spicks and Specks.
