= The Triffids discography =

- Studio albums: 5
- Extended plays: 6
- Live albums: 1
- Compilation albums: 4
- Singles: 10
- Video albums: 1
- Cassettes: 9

The Triffids were an Australian folk rock band from Perth, Western Australia, formed in 1978 by David McComb, Alsy MacDonald and Phil Kakulas. The group released five studio albums, one live album, ten singles, six extended plays, nine cassette tapes, four compilation albums, and one video album.

The band's first release was the cassette Triffids 1st, recorded in May 1978 and released in September of that year. Triffids 2nd was released shortly after the addition of Byron Sinclair to the line-up. Four further cassettes would be released by 1981. Considerable line-up changes had occurred resulting in McComb and MacDonald with Will Akers, Margaret Gillard, Robert McComb (David's older brother) and Mark Peters. Their first single "Stand Up" was released in July 1981 from Triffids 6th. Their first extended play, Reverie appeared in November 1982.

Treeless Plain, their first studio LP album, was released in November 1983. By then the line-up was the McComb brothers and MacDonald with Jill Birt and Martyn P. Casey. In August 1984, the band relocated to London where they recorded Born Sandy Devotional in 1985 which was released in early 1986 and reached the United Kingdom Top 30 Albums Chart. It spawned the single "Wide Open Road" in February, which peaked into the UK Top 30 and Australian Kent Music Report Singles Chart.

== Studio albums ==
Year	Album details	Peak chart positions					
Year	Album details	AUS	NZ	UK	SWE	BEL	UK Indie
1983	Treeless Plain: Released: November 1983; Label: Hot Records/Rough Trade Records (HOT1003); Producer: The Triffids; Format: LP	—	—	—	—	—	6
1986	Born Sandy Devotional: Released: March 1986; Label: White Hot Records (Mushroom Records) (HOTLP1023); Producer: Gil Norton/The Triffids; Format: LP, Cassette	37	—	—	18	39	2
1986	In the Pines: Released: November 1986; Label: White Hot Records (Mushroom Records) (HOT1028); Producer: David McComb/Bruce Callaway; Format: LP	69	—	—	—	78	5
1987	Calenture: Released: November 1987; Label: Island Records (ILPS 9885); Producer: Gil Norton/The Triffids; Format: CD	32	25	—	24	58	—
1989	The Black Swan: Release: April 1989; Label: Island Records (ILPS 9928); Producer: Stephen Street/The Triffids; Format: LP	59	44	63	—	71	—
"—" denotes releases that did not chart.

== Live albums ==
Year	Album details
1990	Stockholm: Released: July 1990; Label: Island Records (L30231); Producer: Lars Aldman; Format: CD

== Compilation albums ==
Year	Album details	Peak chart positions		
Year	Album details	AUS	BEL	GRK
1986	Love in Bright Landscapes: Released: 1986; Label: White Hot Records (L38674); Format: LP	—	—	—
1994	Australian Melodrama: Released: December 1994; Label: White Label (D31182); Format: CD	—	—	—
2008	Beautiful Waste and Other Songs (Mini-Masterpieces 1983–1985): Released: 7 April 2008; Label: Liberation Music (BLUE1342); Format: CD	—	86	—
2010	Wide Open Road: The Best of The Triffids: Released: 5 April 2010; Label: Domino Records (REWIGCD72); Format: CD	—	—	14
"—" denotes releases that did not chart.

== Extended plays ==
Year	EP details	AUS	UK Indie
1982	Reverie: Released: November 1982; Label: Resonant Records (REZ 01113198); Producer: Tim Lambert; Format: 7-inch EP	—	—
1983	Bad Timing and Other Stories: Released: April 1983; Label: White Label (K9003); Producer: Robert Ash; Format: 7-inch EP	—	—
1984	Lawson Square Infirmary: Released: April 1984; Label: Hot Records (MINIHOT2); Producer: Nick Mainsbridge, The Triffids; Format: 12-inch EP	—	—
1984	Raining Pleasure: Released: June 1984; Label: Hot Records (MINIHOT1); Producer: Nick Mainsbridge, The Triffids; Format: 12-inch EP	95	8
1984	Field of Glass: Released: February 1985; Label: Hot Records (HOT12007); Producer: Mark Radcliffe; Format: 12-inch EP	—	8
1987	Peel Sessions: Released: October 1987; Label: Strange Fruit Records (SFPS036); Producer: Dale Griffin; Format: 12-inch EP	—	17
"—" denotes releases that did not chart.

== Cassettes ==
Year	Album details	Sales
1978	Triffids 1st: Released: 1978; Label: Independent (self release); Format: cassette	
1978	Triffids 2nd: Released: 1978; Label: Independent (self release); Format: cassette	
1979	Triffids 3rd: Released: 1978; Label: Independent (self release); Format: cassette	
1980	Triffids 4th: Released: 1980; Label: Independent (self release); Format: cassette	
1978	Triffids Tape 5: Released: 1978; Label: Independent (self release); Format: cassette	
1981	Triffids Sixth: Released: 1981; Label: Independent (self release); Format: cassette	
1983	Dungeon Tape: Released: 1983; Label: Independent (self release); Format: cassette	
1988	Son of Dungeon Tape: Released: 1988; Label: Independent (self release); Format: cassette	
1988	Jack Brabham: Released: December 1988; Label: Independent (self release); Format: cassette	50 copies

== Singles ==
Year	Title	Peak chart positions				Album
Year	Title	AUS	NZ	UK	UK IN	Album
1981	"Stand Up"	—	—	—	—	Triffids Sixth
1982	"Spanish Blue"	—	—	—	—	Single-only release
1984	"Beautiful Waste"	—	—	—	—	Single-only release
1985	"You Don't Miss Your Water"	—	—	—	3	Single-only release
1986	"Wide Open Road"	64	—	26	19	Born Sandy Devotional
1987	"Bury Me Deep in Love"	48	34	—	—	Calenture
1988	"Trick of the Light"	77	—	73	—	Calenture
1988	"Holy Water"	—	—	—	—	Calenture
1989	"Goodbye Little Boy"	81	—	90	—	The Black Swan
1989	"Falling Over You"	—	—	—	—	The Black Swan
2007	"Save What You Can"	—	—	—	—	Promotional release
"—" denotes releases that did not chart.

== DVDs ==
Year	Album details
2009	It's Raining Pleasure: Released: December 2009; Label: Madman Entertainment; Format: DVD
