= Braham (surname) =

Braham is a surname. Notable people with the surname include:

- Bob Braham (1920–1974), Royal Air Force pilot
- David Braham (1834–1905), British-born American musical theater composer (uncle of John Joseph Braham Sr.)
- David Braham (football manager) from Cayman Islands
- Edmund Braham (1860–1921), British-born American pianist, composer, and publisher
- Edward Braham (born 1961), British corporate lawyer
- Frances Braham (1821–1879), Countess Waldegrave
- Hal Braham (1911–1994), American writer
- Henry Braham (born 1965), British cinematographer
- John Braham (tenor) (1774–1856), English opera singer
- John Joseph Braham Sr. (1847–1919), British-born American musical theater composer (nephew of David Braham)
- Leonora Braham (1853–1931), English opera singer
- Loraine Braham (1938–2026), Australian politician
- Najeh Braham (born 1977), Tunisian football player
- Philip Braham (1881–1934), British composer
- Randolph L. Braham (1922–2018), American political scientist
- Ransford Braham (born 1963), Jamaican politician
- Rich Braham (born 1970), American football player
- Richard Braham (c. 1613–1676), English MP
- Robert Braham (fl. 1555), English editor
- Trevor Braham (1922–2020), British mountaineer

== See also ==
- Braham (disambiguation)
- Brabham (surname)
