= Metropolitan Music Co. =

Metropolitan Music Co. may refer to:

- Metropolitan Music Co. (Minneapolis), a Minneapolis-based music publishing company and string instrument retailer founded the late 1800s
- Metropolitan Music Co., an orchestral string instrument wholesaler founded in 1920 and exclusive distributor of John Juzek violins, violas, cellos, and double basses
