= August Geiger =

August Geiger may refer to:

- August Geiger (architect) (1888–1968), American architect
- August Geiger (pilot) (1920–1943), German Luftwaffe night fighter ace
