= Brabham (disambiguation) =

Brabham may refer to:

- Brabham, Western Australia, Australia; a suburb of Perth located in the City of Swan
- Brabham (surname), and a list of people by that name

== Sports ==
- Brabham—Motor Racing Developments, a defunct Formula One racing team
- Brabham Racing, an endurance racing sports car racing team
- Formula Brabham, an Australian open-wheel open-cockpit car racing category
- Brabham Cup, an ice hockey trophy for the North American league ECHL

== Other uses ==
- Brabham Automotive, an Australian carmaker
- Jack Brabham (album), a 1988 album by 'The Triffids'

== See also ==
- Braham (disambiguation)
