= Beautiful Waste and Other Songs (Mini-Masterpieces 1983–1985) =

Compilation album by The Triffids
- Released: 2008
- Recorded: 1983–1985
- Genre: Rock; folk rock
- Length: 65:56
- Label: Liberation Records

The Triffids chronology
Australian Melodrama (1994)	Beautiful Waste and Other Songs (Mini-Masterpieces 1983–1985) (2008)

Beautiful Waste and Other Songs (Mini-Masterpieces 1983–1985) is a compilation album by The Triffids, released in 2008. The album brings together a number of Triffids EPs and singles that have never been previously released on CD.

Specifically, tracks 1–7 were previously released as the Raining Pleasure EP and 8–13 as Lawson Square Infirmary. Tracks 14–16 comprise the contents of 1985's Field of Glass 12". Of the remaining compositions, "Dear Miss Lonely Hearts" and "Native Bride" appeared previously on the 12" version of the "Wide Open Road" single while "Beautiful Waste" was a 1984 A-side, backed on the 7" by "Property Is Condemned".

The original Lawson Square Infirmary EP was the result of a collaboration between McComb and other Triffids with James Paterson (most closely associated with JFK & The Cuban Crisis). Graham Lee, at that time not a member of The Triffids, was also drafted in to play dobro, bolstering the country sound of the recording, and the EP was released not under the moniker of The Triffids but rather as the work of a distinct eponymous band, Lawson Square Infirmary.

== Track listing ==
All songs written by David McComb except where indicated.

1. "Jesus Calling" – 3:42
2. "Embedded" – 3:59
3. "St James Infirmary" (Traditional/Version by McComb) – 3:37
4. "Everybody Has to Eat" (McComb, James Paterson) – 2:31
5. "Ballad of Jack Frost" – 1:50
6. "Property Is Condemned" – 2:59
7. "Raining Pleasure" – 2:38
8. "Figurine" (McComb, Paterson) – 2:27
9. "When My Heart Breaks" (Paterson) – 3:53
10. "Mother Silhouette" (Alsy MacDonald) – 2:59
11. "Mercy" (McComb, Paterson) – 3:16
12. "Crucifixion Speech" – 2:04
13. "Not the Marrying Kind" – 2:45
14. "Bright Lights Big City" – 3:33
15. "Monkey on My Back" – 3:43
16. "Field of Glass" – 9:10
17. "Dear Miss Lonely Hearts" – 3:53
18. "Native Bride" – 3:37
19. "Beautiful Waste" – 3:19
