= Beautiful Waste =

Single by The Triffids
- A-side: "Beautiful Waste"
- B-side: "Property Is Condemned"
- Released: February 1984
- Recorded: December 1983; Emerald City Studios, Sydney
- Genre: Indie rock, folk rock
- Length: 6:14
- Label: White Hot / Mushroom
- Songwriter(s): David McComb
- Producer(s): The Triffids

The Triffids singles chronology
"Spanish Blue" (1982)	"Beautiful Waste" (1984)	"You Don't Miss Your Water" (1985)

"Beautiful Waste" is a single released by Australian rock group, The Triffids in February 1984. Not included on any of the band's studio albums nor extended plays, it was first compiled on Australian Melodrama (1994). Its B-side, "Property Is Condemned", was included on the 1984 EP Raining Pleasure. A film clip was made for "Beautiful Waste". Its name was adapted for a 2008 posthumous compilation of mid-1980s non-album tracks, Beautiful Waste and Other Songs.

In May 2008, Youth Group performed a cover version of "Beautiful Waste" on national radio station Triple J's "Like a Version" segment. Youth Group's Toby Martin had previously filled in as one of the guest vocalists for a reformed The Triffids, at the Sydney Festival performances earlier in that year.

== Track listing ==
All tracks written by David McComb.

1. "Beautiful Waste" – 3:20
2. "Property Is Condemned" – 2:54

== Personnel ==
=== The Triffids ===
- David McComb – lead vocals, guitar, piano, miscellaneous
- Alsy MacDonald – drums, vocals, percussion
- Robert McComb – violin, guitar, keyboards, vocals
- Martyn P. Casey – bass, vocals
- Jill Birt – organ

=== Additional musicians ===
- Ian Macourt – cello
- David Angell – viola
