= Brabham (surname) =

Brabham is a surname. Notable people with the surname include:

== Brabham racing family ==
- Jack Brabham, Australian three-time Formula 1 World Champion
  - Geoff Brabham, Australian international Indy car and Sports Car racing driver
    - Roseina Brabham, jet ski racing champion, wife of Geoff, mother of Matthew
      - Matthew Brabham, Australian/American international racing driver
  - Gary Brabham, Australian international racing driver and convicted rapist
  - David Brabham, Australian international Formula 1 and Sports Car racing driver
    - Lisa Brabham (née Thackwell), racing driver, wife of David, mother of Sam
      - Sam Brabham, Australian racing driver

== Other people ==
- Brenda Brabham, 2005 Miss Pennsylvania USA
- Cary Brabham (born 1970), American-football player
- Danny Brabham (1941–2011), U.S. American-football player
- Doris Brabham Hatt (1890–1969), British artist
- Henry Brabham (1929–2020), founder of the North American ice hockey league ECHL

== See also ==
- Brabham (disambiguation)
- Braham (surname)
