= Braham =

Braham may refer to:

- Braham (surname)
- Braham, Minnesota, a city in the United States
- Braham Murray (1943–2018), English theatre director
- Braham (One Piece), a minor character in the Japanese anime One Piece

== See also ==
- Bahram (disambiguation)
- Brabham (disambiguation)
