= Metropolitan Music Co. (Minneapolis) =

American music publishing and string instrument retailer

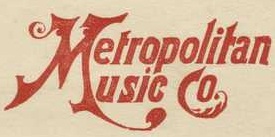
- Logo, from sheet music (circa 1900)

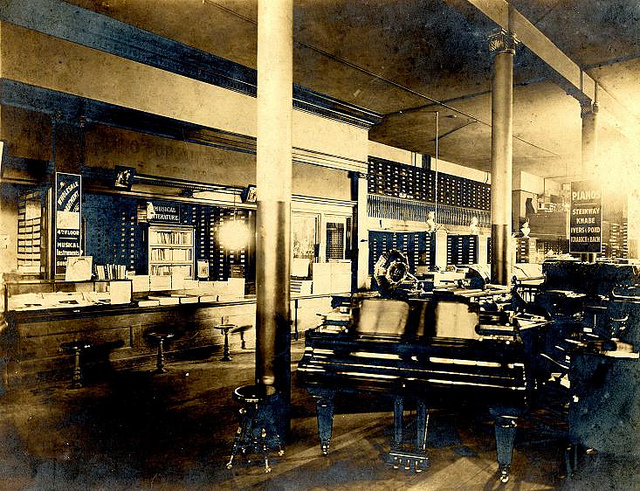
- W.J. Dyer & Bro. music store, St. Paul, Minnesota, (circa 1900)
- Formerly: W.J. Dyer & Bro.
- Industry: Music publisher String instrument retailer
- Founded: Minneapolis, Minnesota (1879)
- Founder: William John Dyer (1841–1925)
- Headquarters: Minneapolis, U.S.
- Area served: Minnesota
- Products: Sheet music Orchestral string instruments

Metropolitan Music Co. was a Minneapolis-based music publishing and string instrument retailer founded in the late 1879 as part of W. J. Dyer & Bro. of Saint Paul, Minnesota. It was originally at 41–43 South Sixth Street. On September 4, 1897, W. J. Dyer & Bro. merged into Metropolitan Music Co. Heinrich Bauer was the proprietor in the late 1890s. B. A. Rose, who had started as an employee in the sheet music department, became the proprietor. The firm served the middle and northwest sections of the United States.

== Selected published works ==
- "Carnival march" (for piano), by R.A.F. (1897) OCLC 62188805
- "We never had a better time at Grady's," lyrics & music by Harry S. Miller (1897) OCLC 44624956
- "Metropolitan coon songs: two step," lyrics & music by Heinrich Bauer (1897) OCLC 497740887
- "The little chicken thief," lyrics & music by Harry Von Tilzer (1897) OCLC 682908362
- "The winner: two step or cake walk for piano," lyrics & music by Edmund Braham (1898) OCLC 53275207
- "Frank David's cake walk and two step," lyrics & music by Frank David (1899) OCLC 57368198
- "Waiting a soldier's return," lyrics & music by Myra Wiren (1899) OCLC 37184481
- "Starlight reverie," lyrics & music by John A. Seidt (1901) OCLC 24479208
- "When song is sweet," lyrics & music by Gertrude Sans-Souci (1902) OCLC 37298509
- "San Francisco," lyrics & music by Mary I. Gellatly (1906) OCLC 50050916
- "Demand the union label," lyrics & music by Silas L. Berry (1906) OCLC 26012050
- "Red Fox Trot," lyrics & music by Ted S. Barron (1914) OCLC 79937762
- "When I Hesitate With You," lyrics & music by Stanley Epstein (1914)
- "My Country Belle," lyrics by Edward Hediger, music by Metropolitan Music Co. (1907)
- "March in G minor," lyrics & music by Stanley R. Avery (1916) OCLC 37299162
- "After the war is over, where will the Kaiser go?" lyrics & music by Fred C. Stoutenburg (1918) OCLC 192133232
- "Second Field Artillery Brigade," lyrics & music by Carl Dillon (1924) OCLC 450038254
- "The brogue my mother spoke," lyrics & music by Al Hay (1925) OCLC 857869549

== Personnel ==
- William John Dyer (1841–1925)
- Charles E. Dyer Sr. (born 1845–1897), William John Dyer's brother
- Heinrich Bauer, Proprietor (late 1890s)
- Bert Aaron Rose (1866–1940), Proprietor
- Edward Rowland Dyer (1867–1941), William John Dyer's son and President from before 1908 and until after 1924
