= Dungeon Tape =

Album by The Triffids

Studio album by The Triffids
- Released: 1981
- Recorded: 12 April 1981
- Genre: Rock, folk rock
- Length: 56:03
- Producer: Paul Bolger

The Triffids chronology
Tapes #1-6 (1978–1981)	Dungeon Tape (1981)	Son of Dungeon Tape (1988)

Dungeon Tape is a cassette tape by Australian folk rock group The Triffids. This tape was only sold at the group's performances in the eastern states of Australia in 1983. The tape was recorded on 12 April 1981 at Dungeon Rehearsal Studios, Palmer Street, Sydney, except the last four tracks which were recorded at Mutant Mule Studios, Perth in December 1981.

In 2010 the group issued a compilation box set, Come Ride with Me... Wide Open Road – The Deluxe Edition of 10× CDs with Disc 5 subtitled Grandson of Dungeon Tape which provides a selection from Dungeon Tape and Son of Dungeon Tape.

== Track listing ==
=== Side A ===
1. "M.G.M."
2. "Too Hot to Move, Too Hot to Think"
3. "Man Who Can"
4. "Chew It Up"
5. "Family Name"
6. "Nothing Good is Going to Come of This"
7. "Work for Nothing"

=== Side B ===
1. "Madeline"
2. "Twisted Brain"
3. "Dead Wind"
4. "Like a Cat on a Hot Tin Roof"
5. "I'll Have It"
6. "Spanish Blue"
7. "You Can Keep It"
8. "Bad Timing"
