= Heinz Vinke =

German World War II fighter pilot

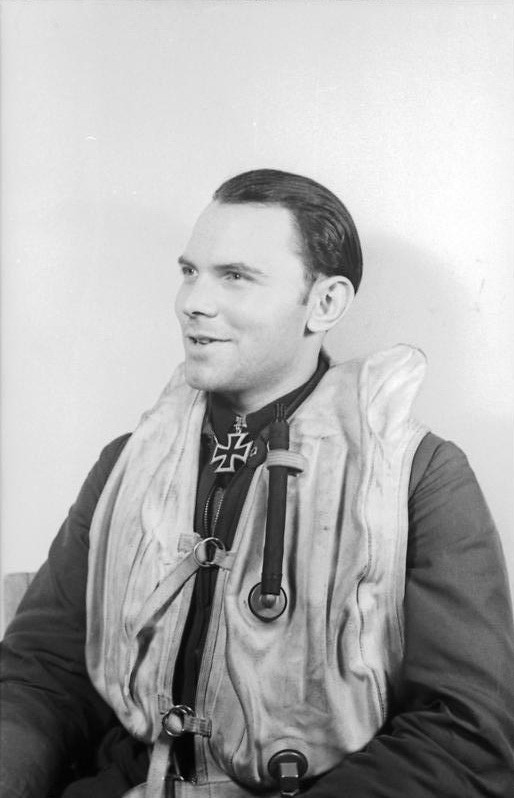
- Born: 22 May 1920; Barby, Free State of Prussia, Weimar Republic
- Died: 26 February 1944 (aged 23); English Channel, off Dunkirk, German-occupied France
- Military career
- Allegiance: Nazi Germany
- Branch: Luftwaffe
- Service years: 1938–1944
- Rank: Oberfeldwebel
- Units: NJG 1, NJG 2
- Conflicts: World War II: Defense of the Reich †; Battle of Berlin (air)
- Awards: Knight's Cross of the Iron Cross with Oak Leaves

Heinz Vinke (22 May 1920 – 26 February 1944) was a German Luftwaffe military aviator during World War II, a night fighter ace credited with 54 aerial victories claimed in approximately 150 combat missions making him the eighteenth most successful night fighter pilot in the history of aerial warfare. All of his victories were claimed over the Western Front in Defense of the Reich missions against the Royal Air Force's (RAF) Bomber Command.

Born in Barby, Vinke grew up in the Weimar Republic and Nazi Germany. Following graduation from school and the compulsory Reichsarbeitsdienst (Reich Labour Service), he joined the military service in 1938. Vinke then served with Nachtjagdgeschwader 1 (NJG 1—1st Night Fighter Wing), flying a Messerschmitt Bf 110 heavy fighter. Following an injury sustained in July 1941, he was posted to Nachtjagdgeschwader 2 (NJG 2—2nd Night Fighter Wing) where he claimed his first aerial victory on the night of 27/28 February 1942. Following his 25th aerial victory, he was awarded the Knight's Cross of the Iron Cross on 19 September 1943. Vinke and his crew were shot down and killed in action on 26 February 1944, while on a search and rescue mission over the English Channel. He was posthumously bestowed with the Knight's Cross of the Iron Cross with Oak Leaves.

== Early life and career ==
Vinke was born on 22 May 1920 in Barby, in the Province of Saxony, a Free State of Prussia. He was the son of merchant Heinrich Vinke and his wife Martha, née Rehse. Until 1935, he attended school in Barby. While at school, he joined the Flying Hitler Youth (Flieger-HJ) and became a glider pilot, receiving his A, B and C license to fly glider aircraft. Following six months of compulsory National Labour Service, he joined the Luftwaffe on 1 April 1938.

== World War II ==
World War II in Europe began on Friday, 1 September 1939, when German forces invaded Poland. At the time, Vinke was based at Stargard on the Fliegerhorst Klützow, present-day Kluczewo Airfield, where he received his flight training which he completed in 1940. (Note: Flight training in the Luftwaffe progressed through the levels A1, A2 and B1, B2, referred to as A/B flight training. A training included theoretical and practical training in aerobatics, navigation, long-distance flights and dead-stick landings. The B courses included high-altitude flights, instrument flights, night landings and training to handle the aircraft in difficult situations. For pilots destined to fly multi-engine aircraft, the training was completed with the Luftwaffe Advanced Pilot's Certificate (Erweiterter Luftwaffen-Flugzeugführerschein), also known as the C-Certificate.) At Stargard, he met his future wife Erika Schröder and they were married on 20 April 1942 in Berlin-Kreuzberg.

At first, he was trained as a Zerstörer (destroyer) pilot. Holding the rank of Unteroffizier, he was posted to the 4. Staffel (4th squadron) of Nachtjagdgeschwader 1 (NJG 1—1st Night Fighter Wing) in early 1941. (Note: For an explanation of the meaning of Luftwaffe unit designation see Organisation of the Luftwaffe during World War II.) On 25 July 1941, Vinke and his radio operator Gerhard Schlein flew Messerschmitt Bf 110 C (Werknummer 2075—factory number) over the North Sea in the vicinity of Texel when they suffered engine problems. Vinke instructed his radio operator to bail out, the parachute failed to open and Schlein fell to his death. Vinke made a forced landing in a corn field near De Cocksdorp, Texel, injuring his back. Vinke was first treated at a hospital in Den Burg and later at Heiloo. Following seven months of convalescence, he was assigned to 5. Staffel (5th squadron) of Nachtjagdgeschwader 2 (NJG 2—2nd Night Fighter Wing), this unit was later redesignated to 11./NJG 1.

=== Night fighter career ===
A map of part of the Kammhuber Line. The 'belt' and night fighter 'boxes' are shown.

Following the 1939 aerial Battle of the Heligoland Bight, Royal Air Force (RAF) attacks shifted to the cover of darkness, initiating the Defence of the Reich campaign. By mid-1940, Generalmajor (Brigadier General) Josef Kammhuber had established a night air defense system dubbed the Kammhuber Line. It consisted of a series of control sectors equipped with radars and searchlights and an associated night fighter. Each sector named a Himmelbett (canopy bed) would direct the night fighter into visual range with target bombers. In 1941, the Luftwaffe started equipping night fighters with airborne radar such as the Lichtenstein radar. This airborne radar did not come into general use until early 1942.

While serving with NJG 2 over Northern Europe, Vinke claimed his first air victory on 27 February 1942, an Armstrong Whitworth Whitley 22 kilometres (14 mi) north-east of Leeuwarden. The aircraft was the RAF Whitley Z9280 from No. 77 Squadron which crashed at 22:58 at Driesum. Four members of the crew, including Squadron Leader Leslie Hugh William Parkin (DFC), were killed in action and one man was taken prisoner of war. For this victory, he received the Iron Cross 2nd Class (Eisernes Kreuz 2. Klasse) that day.

His next claim was filed on the night of 3/4 June 1942 when he shot down a Short Stirling at 02:16 over the Zuiderzee. The same month, on 25/26 June at 00:42 again over the Zuiderzee, he claimed a Handley Page Halifax shot down. Flying Officer John Whittingham and another crew member died, and three others were taken prisoner. His fourth victory was over a Vickers Wellington shot down into the IJsselmeer on 28 June 1942 at 00:54 east of Enkhuizen. Flying Officer Derek Osborne and his crew of four were lost. Credited with four victories, Vinke was awarded the Iron Cross 1st Class (Eisernes Kreuz 1. Klasse) on 1 July 1942. He became an ace when he shot down his fifth opponent, a Vickers Wellington bomber, on the night of 27/28 August 1942 at 02:32. On 9 October, while under the influence of alcohol, Vinke was involved in a small arms accident which resulted in the injury of another soldier. He, and two other involved soldiers, were taken to the Luftwaffe headquarters in Amsterdam. A court-martial sentenced him to five days of confinement. On 9 January 1943, Vinke was again put under arrest and grounded following an unauthorized nosedive over the Leeuwarden Air Base resulting in significant damage to a parked Bf 110 F-4. On 29 March 1943, Vinke was awarded the Honor Goblet of the Luftwaffe (Ehrenpokal der Luftwaffe) and the Front Flying Clasp of the Luftwaffe for Night Fighters (Frontflugspange für Nachtjäger).

Vinke flew regularly during the Battle of the Ruhr. One of two claims on the 9 April 1943 was Lancaster ED554 "EM-Q", from No. 207 Squadron RAF. The action caused the death of Sergeant Harold Healy RCAF and his crew. The seven men are buried in Amsterdam's New Eastern Cemetery. On the night of the 13/14 May 1943 he claimed a 23rd victory over the Netherlands. It may have been Wellington MS473; or misidentified and actually Lancaster ED589 "WS-P" from No. 9 Squadron RAF. Sergeant George Saxton and his crew were killed. His 27th victory was claimed at 02:26 on the night of 22/23 June 1943, Stirling EH889, which crashed into the Ijsselmeer approximately 8 kilometres (5 miles) east of Oosterland, killing Flight Lieutenant T.F. McCrorie and crew. Three nights later, on 25/26 June at 02:47, he claimed his 28th victory over an Avro Lancaster bomber approximately 50 kilometres (31 miles) west of Den Helder, killing Squadron Leader Alfred Young and another six on board.

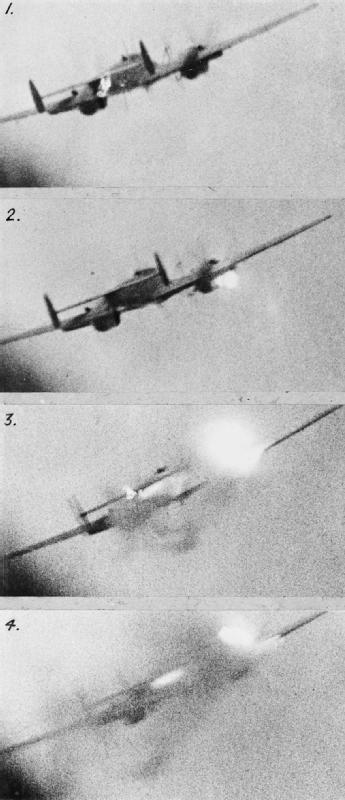
This gun sequence, taken from F/O. George Hardy's aircraft, shows Vinke's Messerschmitt's starboard engine exploding, shortly before it dived to its destruction in the English Channel.

On 17/18 August 1943, RAF Bomber Command targeted Peenemünde and the V-weapons test centre. Five Bristol Beaufighter night fighters of No. 141 Squadron, under the command of Wing Commander Bob Braham, intercepted five Messerschmitt Bf 110s from IV. Gruppe (4th group) of NJG 1, and Feldwebel (Sergeant) Georg Kraft (14 victories) and Feldwebel Vinke (at the time with 20 claims) were both shot down by Braham near Schiermonnikoog. Vinke was the only one of his crew to survive. Vinke observed the demise of Kraft and attempted to attack the Beaufighter in the same way, from below and to starboard. The British airmen managed to obtain a visual contact on Vinke in time, and out-turned him. The control column was shot out from his hand and the British caused fatal damage to the Bf 110 from short range, just missing a collision. Following the death of his former crew Feldwebel Karl Schödel and Unteroffizier Johann Gaa, Vinke teamed up with Unteroffizier Rudolf Dunger.

Vinke was decorated with the Knight's Cross of the Iron Cross (Ritterkreuz des Eisernen Kreuzes) on 19 September 1943, the nomination had been submitted for 25 aerial victories claimed earlier. The presentation was made by Generalmajor Joachim-Friedrich Huth. Just four days later, Vinke shot down Lancaster DV201 for his 29th victory.

Vinke continued to claim through October. On 7 October 1943, Vinke accounted for a Short Stirling 50 km (31 mi) northwest of Vlieland, one source suggests Stirling EH990 "LS-K" from No. 15 Squadron RAF. The bomber was on a mine-laying operation; the pilot Flight Sergeant Thomas Robertson Ewen of the Royal Air Force Volunteer Reserve and his crew died on their only war mission. Vinke made the Stirling claim in the same area and time. On 8/9 October, one source identifies his 33rd aerial victory as possibly Lancaster JB181 from No. 7 Squadron RAF. Flying Officer Bruce Macpherson and his crew were all killed; the eldest was 22, the youngest, air gunner Sergeant Eric Brinton, 17 years old. On 20 October, Vinke downed a Lancaster JB154 of the Pathfinders No. 83 Squadron returning from a Leipzig mission at 21:35 near Anreep, Netherlands. Squadron Leader R.J. Manton (pilot) and all his crew were killed.

On 19/20 February 1944, Vinke claimed three aerial victories, two Lancasters and one Halifax bomber. His first claim of the night, a Lancaster, occurred at 01:46 in sector "BM-77", the second Lancaster was claimed at 01:57 in sector "BM-78", while the Halifax was claimed to be shot down at 02:13 in sector "CX-62". (Note: Victory claims were also logged in a Planquadrat (grid reference), for example "BM-77". The grid map was composed of rectangles measuring 15 minutes of latitude by 30 minutes of longitude, an area of about 360 square miles (930 km^{2}).) Vinke also claimed two other victories that day, earning him the title of "ace-in-a-day". He shot down Lancaster JA921 at 05:08 over the southeast Netherlands, killing Warrant Officer Ramsey Stanners of the Royal Air Force Volunteer Reserve and 5 others on board, whilst also destroying Lancaster JB609 at 05:34 15 km (9.3 mi) northwest of Apeldoorn, killing its crew.

Oberfeldwebel (Master Sergeant) Vinke was shot down and killed while flying Messerschmitt Bf 110 G-4 (Werknummer 740136) of 11./NJG 1 on 26 February 1944, while on a search and rescue mission over the English Channel. The victors were two Hawker Typhoons of No. 198 Squadron RAF, flown by F/L. (later Colonel) Raymond "Cheval" Lallamont DFC and F/O. George Hardy. His crew of Unteroffizier Rudolf Dunger and Unteroffizier Rudolf Walter were also killed. Their bodies were never recovered. On 25 April 1944, he was posthumously awarded the Knight's Cross of the Iron Cross with Oak Leaves (Ritterkreuz des Eisernen Kreuzes mit Eichenlaub), the 465th officer or soldier of the Wehrmacht so honored. Vinke was credited with 54 aerial victories, all of them at night, claimed in approximately 150 combat missions operations.

== Summary of career ==
=== Aerial victory claims ===
Foreman, Parry and Mathews, authors of Luftwaffe Night Fighter Claims 1939 – 1945, researched the German Federal Archives and found records for 53 nocturnal victory claims Mathews and Foreman also published Luftwaffe Aces — Biographies and Victory Claims, listing Vinke with 51 claims.

Chronicle of aerial victories
This and the ♠ (Ace of spades) indicates those aerial victories which made Vinke an "ace-in-a-day", a term which designates a fighter pilot who has shot down five or more airplanes in a single day. This and the ! (exclamation mark) indicates aerial victories listed in Luftwaffe Night Fighter Claims 1939 – 1945 but not in Luftwaffe Aces — Biographies and Victory Claims.
Claim	Date	Time	Type	Location	Serial No./Squadron No.
– 5. Staffel of Nachtjagdgeschwader 2 –
1	27 February 1942	22:58	Whitley	22 km (14 mi) northeast of Leeuwarden	Z9280
2	4 June 1942	02:16	Stirling	Zuiderzee	W7537
3	26 June 1942	00:42	Halifax	Zuiderzee	W1067
4!	28 June 1942	00:42	Wellington	east of Enkhuizen	X3309
5	28 August 1942	02:32	Wellington	east of Enkhuizen	Z8403
6	5 September 1942	02:51	Halifax	9 km (5.6 mi) east of Enkhuizen	
7	14 September 1942	23:48	Wellington	north of Texel	Z8505
8	16 September 1942	22:45	Stirling	6 km (3.7 mi) northwest of Bergen aan Zee	R9318
– 11. Staffel of Nachtjagdgeschwader 1 –
9	17 January 1943	20:25	Lancaster	35 km (22 mi) north of Terschelling	W4321
10!	28 January 1943	00:28	Wellington		
11	26 February 1943	22:28	Stirling	50 km (31 mi) west of Katwijk aan Zee	R9279
12	5 March 1943	22:35	Wellington	10 km (6.2 mi) east of Amsterdam	BK401
13	12 March 1943	22:55	Wellington	50 km (31 mi) west of IJmuiden	HZ263
14	30 March 1943	00:20	Wellington	15 km (9.3 mi) west of Zandvoort	X3965
15	9 April 1943	22:42	Lancaster	16 km (9.9 mi) northwest of Amsterdam	ED554/No. 207 Squadron
16	9 April 1943	23:49	Lancaster	15 km (9.3 mi) west of Utrecht	ED521
17	10 April 1943	00:14	Stirling		ED724/No. 103 Squadron
18	27 April 1943	02:08	Stirling	Zuiderzee	BK657
19	27 April 1943	02:34	Halifax	north of Texel	DG423
20	1 May 1943	02:26	Halifax	Muiderberg	JB803
21	13 May 1943	02:02	Lancaster	Eesterga	ED418
22	13 May 1943	02:17	Lancaster	18 km (11 mi) north-northeast of Utrecht	W4955
23	14 May 1943	03:07	Wellington	35 km (22 mi) west of IJmuiden	MS473
24	24 May 1943	02:01	Lancaster	40 km (25 mi) west of Egmond aan Zee	ED970
25	24 May 1943	02:24	Halifax	2 km (1.2 mi) west of Leiden	HR836
26	26 May 1943	02:33	Stirling	5 km (3.1 mi) northwest of IJmuiden	EH876
27	23 June 1943	02:26	Stirling	8 km (5.0 mi) east of Oosterland	EH889
28	26 June 1943	02:47	Lancaster	50 km (31 mi) west of Den Helder	EE125
29	23 September 1943	23:25	Lancaster		DV201
30	3 October 1943	21:12	Lancaster		JA972
31	3 October 1943	23:22	Halifax	west of Terschelling	DK201
32	7 October 1943	20:26	Stirling	50 km (31 mi) northwest of Vlieland	EH990
33	9 October 1943	00:28	Halifax	30 km (19 mi) south of Groningen	
34	20 October 1943	21:35	Lancaster	Anreep, southeast of Assen	JB154
35	20 October 1943	22:32	Lancaster	3 km (1.9 mi) south of Nijmegen	SD555
36	11 November 1943	20:24	Lancaster	80 km (50 mi) northwest of Terschelling	HX158
37	23 November 1943	18:26	Lancaster	PQ DK-93	JA932
38	3 January 1944	01:27	Lancaster		DV401
39	14 January 1944	20:33	Halifax		ND421
40	19/20 January 1944	—	Lancaster		
41	22 January 1944	21:07	Lancaster		
42	22 January 1944	01:12	Lancaster		DS824
43	29 January 1944	05:10	Lancaster		
44	29 January 1944	05:55	Lancaster		
45	29 January 1944	06:14	Lancaster		
46	30 January 1944	22:10	Lancaster	Kolhorn	
47	30 January 1944	22:25	Lancaster		DS706
48	15 February 1944	22:38	Lancaster	IJsselmeer	DS426
49♠	20 February 1944	01:44	Lancaster	PQ BM-77	
50♠	20 February 1944	01:57	Lancaster	PQ BM-78	DS794
51♠	20 February 1944	02:13	Halifax	PQ CK 62	LL184
52♠	20 February 1944	05:08	Lancaster	PQ HK 3-1	JA921
53♠	20 February 1944	05:34	Lancaster	15 km (9.3 mi) northwest of Apeldoorn	JB609

=== Awards ===
- Iron Cross (1939)
  - 2nd Class (27 February 1942)
  - 1st Class (1 July 1942)
- Front Flying Clasp of the Luftwaffe in Gold
  - for Night Fighter (29 March 1943)
  - in Gold (2 February 1944)
- Honour Goblet of the Luftwaffe on 29 March 1943 as Feldwebel and pilot
- German Cross in Gold on 2 August 1943 as Feldwebel in the 5./Nachtjagdgeschwader 2 (Note: According to Ulrich on 4 July 1943.)
- Knight's Cross of the Iron Cross with Oak Leaves
  - Knight's Cross on 19 September 1943 as Feldwebel and pilot in the 11./Nachtjagdgeschwader 1
  - 465th Oak Leaves on 25 April 1944 as Oberfeldwebel and pilot in the 11./Nachtjagdgeschwader 1

=== Promotions ===
1938:	Flieger (lowest rank of enlisted men)
1939:	Gefreiter (lance corporal)
1939:	Obergefreiter (senior lance corporal)
1940:	Unteroffizier (subordinate officer, corporal)
1942:	Feldwebel (sergeant)
1943:	Oberfeldwebel (master sergeant)
