= Australian Melodrama =

Compilation album by The Triffids
- Released: 1994
- Recorded: 1978–1989
- Genre: Rock, folk rock
- Length: 75:04
- Label: White Hot, Mushroom, Festival
- Producer: Gil Norton, The Triffids

The Triffids chronology
Stockholm (1990)	Australian Melodrama (1994)	Beautiful Waste and Other Songs (Mini-Masterpieces 1983-1985) (2008)

Australian Melodrama is a compilation album by rock group, The Triffids, released in 1994. It covered material from 1983 to 1989 and was issued by the White Hot label via Mushroom Records and Festival Records.

== Track listing ==
1. "Red Pony" - 4:06
2. "Hell of a Summer" - 4:27
3. "Beautiful Waste" - 3:20
4. "Raining Pleasure" - 2:28
5. "Bright Lights Big City" - 3:30
6. "The Seabirds" - 3:18
7. "Wide Open Road" - 4:06
8. "Lonely Stretch" - 5:00
9. "Tender is the Night (The Long Fidelity)" - 3:43
10. "Bury Me Deep in Love" - 4:05
11. "Trick of the Light" - 3:50
12. "Hometown Farewell Kiss" - 4:35
13. "Unmade Love" - 4:02
14. "Jerdacuttup Man" - 4:45
15. "Save What You Can" - 4:29
16. "Falling Over You" - 3:42
17. "Goodbye Little Boy - 3:26
18. "New Year's Greeting (The Country Widower)" - 5:41
19. "In The Pines" - 2:22
