= Son of Dungeon Tape =

Studio album by The Triffids
- Released: 1988
- Genre: Rock, folk rock
- Length: 50:48

The Triffids chronology
Dungeon Tape (1983)	Son of Dungeon Tape (1988)	Jack Brabham Tape (1988)

Son of Dungeon Tape is a cassette tape by Australian folk rock group The Triffids. This tape was only sold at the Triffids’ performances in early 1988. The tape was not simply a re-issue of the original Dungeon Tape with only five of the original tracks making it on to this compilation tape.

In 2010 the group issued a compilation box set, Come Ride with Me... Wide Open Road – The Deluxe Edition of 10× CDs with Disc 5 subtitled Grandson of Dungeon Tape which provides a selection from Dungeon Tape and Son of Dungeon Tape.

== Track listing ==
=== Side A ===
1. "Red Pony"
2. "Play Thing"
3. "My Baby Thinks She's a Train"
4. "M.G.M."
5. "Too Hot To Move, Too Hot to Think"
6. "Nothing Good Is Going to Come of This"
7. "Family Name"
8. "Madeline"

=== Side B ===
1. "Twisted Brain"
2. "I Can't Wait to See Your Gun"
3. "Hours at a Time"
4. "Man Who Can"
5. "Son of Reverie
6. "Son of Stand Up"
7. "Branded"
8. "Nothing Can Take Your Place"
