= You Don't Miss Your Water =

1961 single by William Bell

Single by William Bell

from the album The Soul of a Bell
- B-side: "Formula of Love"
- Released: December 1961
- Recorded: 1961
- Studio: Stax Recording, Memphis, Tennessee
- Genre: R&B, soul
- Length: 3:02
- Label: Stax (S-116)
- Songwriter: William Bell

William Bell singles chronology
"You Don't Miss Your Water" (1961)	"Any Other Way" (1962)

"You Don't Miss Your Water" is a soul song and the debut single written and recorded by American singer William Bell. It was released by Stax Records in 1961. It is Bell's signature song and best known recording.

== Overview ==
The song was written while Bell was in New York, playing with the Phineas Newborn Orchestra, with lyrics that were not inspired by a lost love, but by Bell's own feelings of homesickness. Bell recorded the song upon returning to Memphis, believing that he was making a demo. However, the recording was released as the B-side of the lesser known Bell single "Formula of Love". It was only after DJ's flipped the record over and began playing the B-side instead of the A-side that sales started to pick up.

The song did not chart in the Billboard R&B charts (southern U.S. records were often either not given enough attention by the chart compilers or lacked the slick production of the more popular Detroit and uptown soul outlets), although it did reach #95 on the pop charts. Since then, the track has gone on to become a Southern soul classic. The song was also released on Bell's 1967 album The Soul of a Bell, along with the original version of "Do Right Woman, Do Right Man", which was more famously covered by Aretha Franklin.

Lyrically, the song's theme revolves around the singer's confession of his unfaithfulness to his lover and, now that she's gone, his realization of his foolishness.

But when you left me
And said bye-bye
I missed my water
My well ran dry

— William Bell

== Personnel ==
The following musicians played on the session for "You Don't Miss Your Water".

- Jesse "Spooky" Butler – organ
- Donald "Duck" Dunn – bass
- Howard Grimes – drums
- Marvell Thomas – piano

== Other renditions ==
"You Don't Miss Your Water" was covered by Stax vocalist Wendy Rene in 1965, with Bell and Isaac Hayes credited as writers, but with some lyric changes and a re-titling to "Reap What You Sow." Otis Redding released the song on his critically acclaimed 1965 album, Otis Blue. Fellow soul singer Percy Sledge released a version of the song on his 1967 album The Percy Sledge Way (it was the B-side to Sledge's recording of "Pledging My Love" in the same year).

The Byrds covered "You Don't Miss Your Water" on their 1968 album, Sweetheart of the Rodeo, with lead vocals sung by guitarist Roger McGuinn, although an alternate version featuring Gram Parsons on lead vocals was released on The Byrds box set in 1990. The song was also covered by Taj Mahal on his 1968 album The Natch'l Blues, and Jerry Lee Lewis covered the song in 1972.

American country singer and songwriter O. B. McClinton released his version as a single in 1973. A ska version of the song was recorded by Peter Tosh & The Wailers in 1965.

The Good Ol' Persons recorded a bluegrass cover of the song in their 1986 album I Can't Stand to Ramble. Brian Eno covered the song in 1988 for the soundtrack album to the film Married to the Mob. Eno's version is a languid piece, with guitars, harmonized vocals and synthesizers, which makes slight alterations to the lyrics (e.g., changing "But now you've left me/Oh, how I cry" to "But when you left me/Oh, how I cried") and replaces the second chorus with a repeat of the first.

== The Triffids' version ==
"You Don't Miss Your Water (Till Your Well Runs Dry)"

Single by The Triffids
- B-side: "Convent Walls"
- Released: August 1985
- Recorded: February 21 & 23, 1985; June 6 & 7, 1985
- Studio: Albert Studios, Sydney; Berwick Street, Soho, London
- Genre: Folk rock
- Length: 6:10 (7-inch); 12:14 (12-inch)
- Label: White Hot / Mushroom
- Songwriter: William Bell
- Producer: The Triffids

The Triffids singles chronology
"Beautiful Waste" (1984)	"You Don't Miss Your Water (Till Your Well Runs Dry)" (1985)	"Wide Open Road" (1986)

"You Don't Miss Your Water" was also released as a single by the Australian folk rock group, The Triffids. Their version appeared as a 7-inch single and a 12-inch single in August 1985. It was also available in Limited Edition Aquablue vinyl with cover artwork to accompany (aquablue replaced the grey of the original sleeve).

=== Track listing ===
All songs written by David McComb unless noted.

1. "You Don't Miss Your Water (Till Your Well Runs Dry)" (William Bell) - 2:50
2. "Convent Walls" - 3:20
3. "Beautiful Waste" (12" single only) - 3:20
4. "You Don't Miss Your Water (Till Your Well Runs Dry)" [Instrumental] (William Bell) (12" single only)

=== Personnel ===
- David McComb - vocals, guitar
- Alsy MacDonald - drums
- Robert McComb - guitar, violin, bass
- Martyn P. Casey (using pseudonym "Daubney Carshott") - bass
- Jill Birt - electric piano, organ
- Graham Lee - pedal steel, guitar, vocals
- Margaret Lami - harmony vocals

== Use in pop culture ==
In 2022, "You Don't Miss Your Water" as performed by Otis Redding was featured in the South Park television special South Park: The Streaming Wars Part 2.
