= List of The Triffids Compact Cassettes =

The Triffids - Cassettes #1-6

Between 1978 and 1981, with a shifting roster of musicians, Australian folk rock group The Triffids independently released six cassette tapes. Robert McComb joined his younger brother, David McComb's band as violinist and second guitarist in 1979, in time for their fourth tape. In 2010 the group issued a compilation box set, Come Ride with Me... Wide Open Road – The Deluxe Edition of 10× CD with Disc 3 providing a selection from tapes 1 to 4 and Disc 4 containing tapes 5 and 6.

== Tape #1 ==
Tape #1 was recorded on 27 and 28 May 1978 on a Revox A77 and released in 1978. It was produced by The Triffids and arranged by David McComb.

=== Track listing ===
1. "What Would the Martians Think"
2. "Nerves"
3. "Mark" ^^
4. "Trouble"
5. "Martyrs" ^^
6. "Rathouse"
7. "GBH"
8. "No" ^^
9. "Take Me to Your Leader" ^^
10. "Animals"
11. "The Terrible Infant Infant II"

^^ Tracks appear on Come Ride with Me... Wide Open Road – The Deluxe Edition (2010)

=== Personnel ===
==== The Triffids ====
- Allan MacDonald - drums, organ
- David McComb - lead vocals, bass, organ
- Phil Kakulas - guitar, vocals, bass, organ

==== Additional musicians ====
- Andrew McGowan - organ, guitar, drums
- Kirke Godfrey - guitar, organ

== Tape #2 ==
Tape #2 was recorded on 4 and 6 September 1978 and released in 1978.

=== Track listing ===
1. "Philosophical Stroll" ^^
2. "What's the Difference" ^^
3. "Butterfly" ^^
4. "I'm Not Losing Sleep"
5. "New Vision" ^^
6. "Standard Talking"
7. "The Diplomatic Corps" ^^
8. "The Jinx of E.H. Lincolnburg"
9. "Out of Tune" ^^
10. "Spring in the Fall"

^^ Tracks appear on Come Ride with Me... Wide Open Road – The Deluxe Edition (2010)

=== Personnel ===
==== The Triffids ====
- David McComb - guitar, vocals
- Phil Kakulas - guitar, vocals
- Byron Sinclair - bass
- Allan MacDonald - drums, vocals

== Tape #3 ==
Tape #3 was recorded on 3 and 4 February 1979 and released in 1979.

=== Track listing ===
1. "Mystery"
2. "I Was a Teenage Teenager" ^^
3. "The Pit and the Pendulum and Me"
4. "Christmas Time"
5. "Jeremy Joy" ^^
6. "Nedlands by Night"
7. "I'm Sincere"
8. "The Frontier"
9. "True Love"
10. "All the Same"
11. "Sixteen Again" ^^

time 37:06

^^ Tracks appear on Come Ride with Me... Wide Open Road – The Deluxe Edition (2010)

=== Personnel ===
==== The Triffids ====
- David McComb - guitar, vocals
- Phil Kakulas - guitar, vocals
- Byron Sinclair - bass
- Allan MacDonald - drums, vocals

== Tape #4 ==
Tape #4 was recorded in August 1979 and released in 1979.

=== Track listing ===
1. "Cyclone" ^^
2. "Everyone Likes to Disco"
3. "Jeremy Joy"
4. "Artist" ^^
5. "Human Interest" ^^
6. "Paradise"
7. "Careless City" ^^
8. "Kids These Days"
9. "Blox" ^^
10. "I'm Gonna Fly to the Moon" ^^
11. "Little Voices" ^^
12. "Actress" ^^
13. "Adaptable" ^^
14. "Aim for My Heart" ^^
15. "Glamour Boy" ^^
16. "Remember When You Were a Child"

time 51:16

^^ Tracks appear on Come Ride with Me... Wide Open Road – The Deluxe Edition (2010)

=== Personnel ===
==== The Triffids ====
- David McComb - guitar, vocals
- Rob McComb - guitar, violin
- Byron Sinclair - bass
- Allan MacDonald - drums, vocals

== Tape #5 ==
Tape #5 was recorded in March/April 1980 and released 1980

=== Track listing ===
1. "Tuscan St Retirement Village"
2. "My Next Door Neighbour"
3. "Farmers Never Visit Nightclubs"
4. "It Was a Wednesday"
5. "I Can't Wait to See Your Gun"
6. "Surfer Boy in Leather"
7. "On the Street Where You Live"
8. "In the Tropicana Lounge"
9. "The Trumpet of the Moon"
10. "Pile Up"
11. "Never Again"
12. "Hey Mary Ann"
13. "Nervous Side of Town"
14. "Southern Religious Programme Pts 1 & 2"

^^ All tracks appear on Come Ride with Me... Wide Open Road – The Deluxe Edition (2010)

=== Personnel ===
==== The Triffids ====
- David McComb - guitar, vocals
- Robert McComb - guitar, violin
- Margaret Gillard - keyboards
- Byron Sinclair - bass
- Allan MacDonald - drums, vocals

== Tape #6 ==
Tape #6 was recorded and released in 1981. It was recorded with two separate line-ups, one featuring Mark Peters on drums the other with Allan MacDonald on drums.

=== Track listing ===
1. "Somewhere in the Shadows"
2. "You Can Spend"
3. "The Marrying Kind"
4. "A Place in the Sun"
5. "Stand Up"
6. "Calm Down"
7. "Reverie"
8. "Don't You Know There's a World Going On"
9. "No Desire"
10. "Digging a Hole"
11. "Terry Angeline"
12. "Native Bride"
13. "Providence"
14. "Thanks for Everything"
15. "Lanallu"

Total Time 78:20

^^ All tracks appear on Come Ride with Me... Wide Open Road – The Deluxe Edition (2010)

=== Personnel ===
==== The Triffids ====
- David McComb - guitar, vocals
- Robert McComb - guitar, violin
- Will Akers - bass, vocals
- Margaret Gillard - keyboards
- Mark Peters - drums
- Allan MacDonald - drums, vocals
