= August Geiger (pilot) =

German World War II fighter pilot

- Born: 6 May 1920; Überlingen, Weimar Republic
- Died: 29 September 1943 (aged 23); Zuiderzee, German-occupied Netherlands
- Cause of death: Killed in action
- Burial place: Ysselsteyn German war cemetery, Netherlands
- Military career
- Allegiance: Nazi Germany
- Branch: Luftwaffe
- Service years: 1939–1943
- Rank: Hauptmann (captain)
- Unit: NJG 1
- Commands: 7./NJG 1
- Conflicts: World War II: Defense of the Reich †
- Awards: Knight's Cross of the Iron Cross with Oak Leaves

August Geiger (6 May 1920 – 29 September 1943) was a German Luftwaffe military aviator during World War II, a night fighter ace credited with 53 aerial victories making him the nineteenth most successful night fighter pilot in the history of aerial warfare. (Note: According to Obermaier he was credited with 54 aerial victories.) All of his victories were claimed over the Western Front in Defense of the Reich missions, the majority at night against the Royal Air Force's (RAF) Bomber Command and one daytime claim over a United States Army Air Forces (USAAF) Boeing B-17 Flying Fortress.

Born in Überlingen, Geiger grew up in the Weimar Republic and Nazi Germany. Following graduation from school, he joined the military service in 1939 and was trained to fly Messerschmitt Bf 110 heavy fighter. In mid-1941, he transferred to Nachtjagdgeschwader 1 (NJG 1—1st Night Fighter Wing) where he became a night fighter pilot and claimed his first aerial victory on the night of 25/26 June 1942. Geiger was appointed squadron leader of 7. Staffel (7th squadron) of NJG 1 in January 1943. Following his 26th aerial victory, he was awarded the Knight's Cross of the Iron Cross on 22 May 1943. Geiger was killed in action when he was shot down by an RAF night fighter on the night of 29 September 1943. He was posthumously bestowed with the Knight's Cross of the Iron Cross with Oak Leaves.

== Early life and career ==
Geiger was born on 6 May 1920 in Überlingen, near Lake Constance, which was part of the Republic of Baden during the Weimar Republic. He was the son of a typographer. After graduation from school and receipt of his Abitur (university entry qualification), Geiger joined the Luftwaffe on 15 November 1939 as a Fahnenjunker (cadet). Following flight training, (Note: Flight training in the Luftwaffe progressed through the levels A1, A2 and B1, B2, referred to as A/B flight training. A training included theoretical and practical training in aerobatics, navigation, long-distance flights and dead-stick landings. The B courses included high-altitude flights, instrument flights, night landings and training to handle the aircraft in difficult situations. For pilots destined to fly multi-engine aircraft, the training was completed with the Luftwaffe Advanced Pilot's Certificate (Erweiterter Luftwaffen-Flugzeugführerschein), also known as the C-Certificate.) he was promoted to Leutnant (second lieutenant) on 1 April 1941.

== World War II ==
World War II in Europe had begun on Friday, 1 September 1939, when German forces invaded Poland. Following the 1939 aerial Battle of the Heligoland Bight, Royal Air Force (RAF) attacks shifted to the cover of darkness, initiating the Defence of the Reich campaign. By mid-1940, Generalmajor (Brigadier General) Josef Kammhuber had established a night air defense system dubbed the Kammhuber Line. It consisted of a series of control sectors equipped with radars and searchlights and an associated night fighter. Each sector named a Himmelbett (canopy bed) would direct the night fighter into visual range with target bombers. In 1941, the Luftwaffe started equipping night fighters with airborne radar such as the Lichtenstein radar. This airborne radar did not come into general use until early 1942.

=== Night fighter career ===
A map of part of the Kammhuber Line. The 'belt' and night fighter 'boxes' are shown.

In mid-1941, Geiger was posted as to 9. Staffel (9th squadron) of Nachtjagdgeschwader 1 (NJG 1—1st Night Fighter Wing). (Note: For an explanation of the meaning of Luftwaffe unit designation see Organisation of the Luftwaffe during World War II.) This Staffel was subordinated to III. Gruppe (3rd group) of NJG 1 under the command of Hauptmann Wolfgang Thimmig. He claimed his first aerial victory on 9 July 1941 over a Handley Page Halifax bomber shot down 10 kilometers (6.2 miles) south of Nijmegen at 23:32. The aircraft shot down was Halifax L9521 from the No. XXXV (Madras Presidency) Squadron on its mission to bomb the Leuna works.

Now flying with 8. Staffel of NJG 1, Geiger claimed his second aerial victory on the night 19/20 June 1942 when he shot down a Stirling bomber 4 kilometers (2.5 miles) southeast of Neuenhaus. That night, RAF bombers objective was Emden and lost 8 out of 191 aircraft, including Stirling R9352 from No. 15 Squadron to Geiger's attack. On 25/26 June, RAF Bomber Command sent over 1,000 bomber to Bremen. Luftwaffe night fighter pilots claimed 48 aerial victories, including three by Geiger. He was credited with shooting down the Vickers Wellington bomber R1078 from No. 11 Operational Training Unit near Rheine, the Armstrong Whitworth Whitley bomber AD689 from No. 10 Operational Training Unit near Lingen, and the Short Stirling bomber N3754 from No. 7 Squadron.

On 29/30 July, RAF Bomber Command targeted Hamburg. The RAF lost 30 aircraft in the attack, including the Wellington bomber Z1570 from the Royal New Zealand Air Force (RNZAF) No. 75 Squadron shot down by Geiger near Neuenhaus. The following night, Bomber Command sent 291 bombers to Saarbrücken. In defense of this attack, Geiger shot down the Whitley bomber Z9230 from No. 138 Squadron west-northwest of Rijssen. He received the Honor Goblet of the Luftwaffe (Ehrenpokal der Luftwaffe) on 19 October 1942.

=== Squadron leader ===
Geiger was appointed Staffelkapitän (squadron leader) of the 7. Staffel of NJG 1 on 5 January 1943. Geiger claimed his first aerial victory with 7. Staffel on 1 March 1943. At 23:52, he claimed a Halifax bomber 2 kilometres (1.2 miles) northwest of Zutphen. That night, the RAF Bomber Command attacked Berlin with 302 aircraft. Geiger's victim may have been Halifax W7877 from No. 35 Squadron. This Halifax, with an almost intact H2S ground scanning radar system, allowed the Germans to analyze the radar. This led to the development of the FuG 350 (FuG—Funkgerät) Naxos radar detector, which allowed the night fighters to home on to the H2S emitting signals.

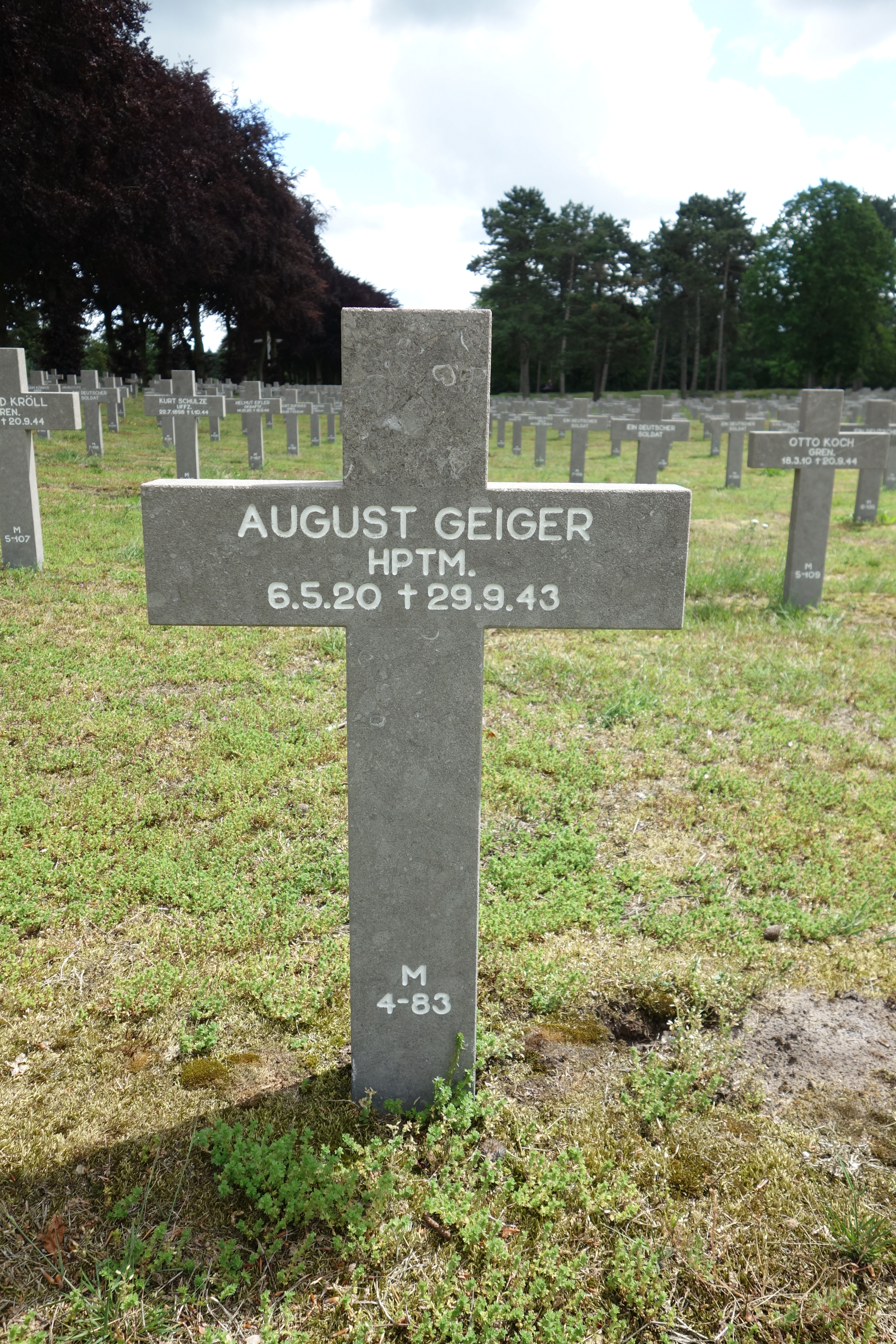
German War Cemetery Ysselsteyn - August Geiger

On the night of 29/30 March 1943, Geiger became an "ace-in-a-day", in this instance an "ace-in-a-night", taking his total to 20 aerial victories. That night, he claimed one Halifax, two Wellington and three Avro Lancaster bombers. On his first mission of the night at 22:52, he shot down Wellington bomber HE182 from the 431 (Iroquois) Squadron near Ahaus. He then claimed Wellington bomber HE385 from No. 196 Squadron at 23:15 near Barchem. On his second mission, Geiger claimed Halifax bomber BE244 from No. 51 Squadron returning from Berlin and was intercepted near Vorden. He then shot down Lancaster bomber ED596 from No. 106 Squadron which came down near Delden at 04:27. His last aerial victory of the night was over Lancaster bomber W4327 from the Royal Australian Air Force (RAAF) No. 460 Squadron which came down near Kloosterhaar in Twenterand. (Note: According to Chorley, one of his victims may have been Lancaster ED391 of No. 460 Squadron RAAF. Flight Sergeant David Harold Victor Harlick and his crew died.)

Geiger was promoted to Oberleutnant (first lieutenant) on 1 April. On 1 May, Geiger downed Halifax DT471 of 405 Maritime Patrol Squadron flown by H P Atkinson. Atkinson, and one other crewmember died. The RAF bombed Duisburg on the night of 12/13 May, losing 34 of the 572 bombers making the attack. Defending against this attack, Geiger claimed three aerial victories. He shot down a Halifax bomber from No. 35 Squadron and another one from No. 77 Squadron, plus the Wellington bomber HE321 from the Royal Canadian Air Force (RCAF) 428 Ghost Squadron. Geiger was awarded with the Knight's Cross of the Iron Cross (Ritterkreuz des Eisernen Kreuzes) on 22 May 1943, the nomination had been submitted for 26 aerial victories claimed earlier. The presentation was made by Generalmajor Kammhuber.

On the night of 23/24 May, Geiger shot down two Lancaster bombers. One of which was Lancaster bomber W4984 from the RAAF No. 460 Squadron shot down near Emmen. Bomber Command had sent 829 bombers to Dortmund of which 38 did not return. On the night of 12/13 June, Bochum was attacked by Bomber Command and 24 of 503 bombers were shot down. Geiger was credited with destroying Lancaster ED584 from No. 49 Squadron near Raalte. On 1 July, he was promoted to Hauptmann (captain) and received the German Cross in Gold (Deutsches Kreuz in Gold) on 31 August 1943. That night Geiger claimed his 44th victory over Stirling EH961 from No. 196 Squadron. Sergeant J. Griffiths and two other members of the seven man crew were killed. Crew member and gunner Sergeant C P Pierce was among the youngest fatalities in the RCAF in 1943, aged 18.

On 29 September 1943, Geiger was shot down by the Bristol Beaufighter VI of Wing commander Bob Braham of No. 141 Squadron RAF over the Zuiderzee, Netherlands. Geiger and his radio operator Feldwebel Dieter Koch managed to bail out of their Messerschmitt Bf 110 G-4 (Werknummer 5477—factory number), but both drowned. On 2 March 1944, Geiger was posthumously awarded the Knight's Cross of the Iron Cross with Oak Leaves (Ritterkreuz des Eisernen Kreuzes mit Eichenlaub), the 416th officer or soldier of the Wehrmacht so honored. He was buried at the German war cemetery Ysselsteyn (block M, row 4, grave 83) in the Netherlands.

== Summary of career ==
=== Aerial victory claims ===
According to US historian David T. Zabecki, Geiger was credited with 54 aerial victories. Spick lists him with 53 nocturnal aerial victories claimed in an unknown number of combat missions. Foreman, Parry and Mathews, authors of Luftwaffe Night Fighter Claims 1939 – 1945, researched the German Federal Archives and found records for 51 nocturnal victory claims. Mathews and Foreman also published Luftwaffe Aces — Biographies and Victory Claims, listing Geiger with 48 claims, plus two further unconfirmed claims.

Chronicle of aerial victories
This and the ♠ (Ace of spades) indicates those aerial victories which made Geiger an "ace-in-a-day", a term which designates a fighter pilot who has shot down five or more airplanes in a single day or night. This and the ! (exclamation mark) indicates aerial victories listed in Luftwaffe Night Fighter Claims 1939 – 1945 but not in Luftwaffe Aces — Biographies and Victory Claims. This and the ? (question mark) indicates information discrepancies listed in Luftwaffe Night Fighter Claims 1939 – 1945 and in Luftwaffe Aces — Biographies and Victory Claims.
Claim	Date	Time	Type	Location	Serial No./Squadron No.
– III. Gruppe of Nachtjagdgeschwader 1 –
1? (Note: According to Mathews and Foreman, this claim was with 9. Staffel.)	9 July 1941	23:32	Halifax	10 km (6.2 mi) south of Nijmegen	L9521/No. 35 Squadron
– 8. Staffel of Nachtjagdgeschwader 1 –
2	20 June 1942	02:22	Stirling	4 km (2.5 mi) southeast of Neuenhaus	R9352/No. 15 Squadron
3	26 June 1942	01:20	Wellington	20 km (12 mi) northeast of Rheine	R1078/No. 11 Operational Training Unit
4	26 June 1942	01:30	Whitley	10 km (6.2 mi) northwest of Lingen	AD689/No. 10 Operational Training Unit
5	26 June 1942	01:58	Stirling	6 km (3.7 mi) northwest of Nordhorn	N3754/No. 7 Squadron
6	28 June 1942	01:29	Wellington	north-northeast of Lingen	Z1619/No. 156 Squadron
7	3 July 1942	02:49	Wellington	6 km (3.7 mi) northwest of Lochem	Z8579/No. 12 Squadron
8	29 July 1942	02:35	Wellington	5 km (3.1 mi) north-northwest of Neuenhaus	Z1570/No. 75 Squadron
9	30 July 1942	00:58	Whitley	8 km (5.0 mi) west-northwest of Rijssen	Z9230/No. 138 Squadron
10	6 August 1942	01:35	Halifax	15 km (9.3 mi) south of Zwolle	W1215/No. 158 Squadron
11	10 August 1942	04:34	Wellington	8 km (5.0 mi) south-southwest of Deventer	
12	11 September 1942	00:02	Wellington	2 km (1.2 mi) east of Osterwieck	
– 7. Staffel of Nachtjagdgeschwader 1 –
13	1 March 1943	23:52	Halifax	2 km (1.2 mi) northwest of Zutphen	Halifax W7877/No. 35 Squadron.
14	2 March 1943	00:37	Halifax	1 km (0.62 mi) west of Markelo	
15	4 March 1943	11:33	B-17		
16♠	29 March 1943	22:52	Wellington	5 km (3.1 mi) southwest of Ahaus	HE182/431 (Iroquois) Squadron
17♠	29 March 1943	23:15	Wellington	west-northwest of Borculo	HE385/No. 196 Squadron
18♠	30 March 1943	03:47	Halifax	10 km (6.2 mi) southeast of Zutphen	BE244/No. 51 Squadron
19♠	30 March 1943	04:27	Lancaster	7 km (4.3 mi) northeast of Deventer	Lancaster ED596/No. 106 Squadron
20♠	30 March 1943	04:46	Lancaster	3 km (1.9 mi) northwest of Lieveide	W4327/No. 460 Squadron
21	30 March 1943	23:00	Lancaster	5 km (3.1 mi) north of Gemen	
23	1 May 1943	03:21	Halifax	northwest of Nijmegen	
24	5 May 1943	02:09	Halifax	west of Zwolle	
25	13 May 1943	02:06	Halifax	Vreden	No. 35 Squadron
26	13 May 1943	02:06	Wellington	southwest of Oldenzaal	HE321/428 Ghost Squadron
27	13 May 1943	02:20	Halifax	12 km (7.5 mi) south of Hengelo	No. 77 Squadron
28	24 May 1943	02:07	Lancaster	48 km (30 mi) east of Meppel	W4984/No. 460 Squadron
29	24 May 1943	02:30	Lancaster	18 km (11 mi) east of Devemer	
30	13 June 1943	02:37	Lancaster	7 km (4.3 mi) north-northeast of Raalte	ED584/No. 49 Squadron
31	15 June 1943	01:44	Lancaster	7 km (4.3 mi) southeast of Terlet	R5551/No. 106 Squadron
32	23 June 1943	01:33	Wellington	9 km (5.6 mi) north of Wesel	
33	23 June 1943	01:35	Wellington	3 km (1.9 mi) north of Rees	HZ312/429 (Bison) Squadron
34	23 June 1943	01:26	Stirling	Empe	
35	23 June 1943	02:00	Lancaster	10 km (6.2 mi) southwest of Steenwijk	
36	23 June 1943	02:00	Lancaster	25 km (16 mi) west of Volendam	
37? (Note: According to Mathews and Foreman, this claim was unconfirmed.)	10 July 1943	02:40	Halifax	Eprave, southeast of Dinant	
38?	14 July 1943	02:10	Lancaster	Forstes-Veneurs	DS690/115 Squadron
39!	24/25 July 1943	—	Lancaster	10 km (6.2 mi) east of Cloppenburg	
40	30 July 1943	01:25	Lancaster	2 km (1.2 mi) southeast of Ahrensfelde	
41	18 August 1943	02:08	Halifax	15 km (9.3 mi) northwest of Greifswald	
42	18 August 1943	02:08	Lancaster	2 km (1.2 mi) south of Reinberg	
43	28 August 1943	02:20	Stirling	Gerlachshausen	
44	31 August 1943	23:28	Stirling	9 km (5.6 mi) south-southwest of Enschede	
45	3 September 1943	23:50	Stirling	1 km (0.62 mi) southwest of Hanover	
46	6 September 1943	00:24	Lancaster	Oppen	W4370/No. 12 Squadron
47	6 September 1943	00:45	Stirling	Rheinhausen	
48	22 September 1943	22:35	Stirling	Gestorf	
49	27 September 1943	22:10	Lancaster	Zuiderzee	
50	27 September 1943	23:30	Halifax	near Munich	
51	28 September 1943	00:01	Halifax	south Papenburg	

=== Awards ===
- Honour Goblet of the Luftwaffe on 19 October 1942 as Leutnant and pilot
- German Cross in Gold on 31 August 1943 as Hauptmann in the 1./Nachtjagdgeschwader 1
- Knight's Cross of the Iron Cross with Oak Leaves
  - Knight's Cross on 22 May 1943 as Oberleutnant and Staffelkapitän of the 7./Nachtjagdgeschwader 1
  - 416th Oak Leaves on 2 March 1944 as Hauptmann and Gruppenkommandeur of the III./Nachtjagdgeschwader 1

=== Promotions ===
1 April 1941:	Leutnant (second lieutenant)
1 April 1943:	Oberleutnant (first lieutenant)
1 July 1943:	Hauptmann (captain)
