= John Braham (RAF officer) =

British World War II flying ace

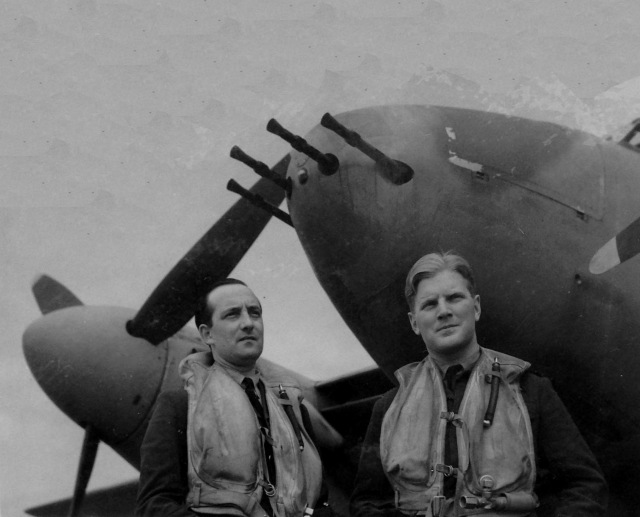
- Braham (right) with his long-serving radio and radar operator Wing Commander Bill "Sticks" Gregory, 1943. Gregory survived the war and died in 2001.
- Born: 6 April 1920; Holcombe, Somerset, England
- Died: 7 February 1974 (aged 53); Nova Scotia, Canada
- Military career
- Allegiance: United Kingdom (1937–52); Canada (1952–68)
- Branch: Royal Air Force; Royal Canadian Air Force
- Service years: 1937–68
- Rank: Group Captain
- Nickname: Bob
- Commands: No. 141 Squadron RAF
- Conflicts: Second World War
- Awards: Distinguished Service Order & Two Bars; Distinguished Flying Cross & Two Bars; Air Force Cross; Order of the Crown (Belgium); Croix de guerre (Belgium)

John Randall Daniel "Bob" Braham, DSO & Two Bars, DFC & Two Bars, AFC, CD (6 April 1920 – 7 February 1974) was a Royal Air Force (RAF) night fighter pilot and fighter ace during the Second World War.

Braham was born in April 1920. Upon leaving school as a teenager he worked for his local constabulary as a clerk. Bored with civilian life, Braham joined the RAF on a five-year short service commission in December 1937. He began basic training in March 1938 and then advanced training from August to December. Upon the completion of flight training, he was posted to No. 29 Squadron RAF based at RAF Debden, where he learned to fly the Hawker Hurricane and Bristol Blenheim. In 1939 the squadron began to organise itself as a specialised night fighter unit.

By August 1940, the Battle of Britain was underway. He gained his first victory on 24 August, which remained his only success in the battle. In September 1940, No. 29 Squadron was re-equipped with the Bristol Beaufighter. Braham continued operations during "The Blitz", claiming the destruction of two more enemy aircraft. By the end of 1940 he had been awarded the Distinguished Flying Cross (DFC).

Braham continued to operate as an anti-intruder pilot after the Blitz ended in May 1941. He became an ace in September 1941, having achieved five victories, and was awarded a bar to his DFC in November 1941. In June 1942 he was promoted to squadron leader. By October 1942 Braham had claimed 12 enemy aircraft destroyed and he was awarded the Distinguished Service Order (DSO). Braham also flew missions with RAF Coastal Command during this time and claimed a U-boat damaged and an E-boat destroyed. He was then promoted to wing commander and given command of No. 141 Squadron RAF. Braham undertook more intruder sorties into German-occupied Europe at this point and received a second bar to his DFC in June 1943 and by September 1943 had gained seven more victories, including three, possibly four, German night fighter aces. Consequently, he was awarded a bar to his DSO.

The squadron soon converted to the De Havilland Mosquito and in February 1944 Braham was transferred to the operations staff at No. 2 Group RAF but was permitted to fly one operation per week. He achieved nine victories in the Mosquito and in June 1944 was awarded a second bar to his DSO. Braham's war came to an end on 24 June 1944 when he was shot down by a pair of single-engine German Focke-Wulf Fw 190 fighters. Braham was captured and spent the rest of the war as a prisoner. He was liberated in May 1945.

Braham was the most highly decorated airman in RAF Fighter Command. He claimed the destruction of 29 enemy aircraft. In addition, he claimed a further six damaged and four probable victories. One of these probable victories can be confirmed through German records, making an unofficial total of 30 enemy aircraft destroyed. Nineteen were achieved at night. He was the most successful British pilot on twin-engine aircraft. The 19 victories claimed at night rivalled John "Cats Eyes" Cunningham's tally and was bettered only by night fighter pilot Branse Burbridge.

After the war he was offered a permanent commission, which he initially accepted. Having resigned his commission in March 1946 he re-enlisted briefly. After struggling to find a career that would support his family, Braham emigrated to Canada with his family and enlisted in the Royal Canadian Air Force (RCAF) in 1952. Having held office at the Supreme Headquarters Allied Powers Europe, Braham retired from military life and began working as a civilian for the Department of Indian Affairs and Northern Development. He continued to work there until his death from an undiagnosed brain tumor in 1974, aged 53.

== Early life ==
John Braham was born on 6 April 1920 in Holcombe, Somerset. His father, Ernest Goodall Braham, was a Methodist minister who earned his qualifications at Bristol and Liverpool University. Reverend Braham then became a Doctor of Theology after studying at King's College London in 1935. Ernest had served as a pilot in the Royal Flying Corps (RFC) in First World War.

Braham was educated at preparatory school at Belmont from 1930, and then moved to the public school in Taunton in Somerset. He attended schools in southern England as the Brahams moved across the country to London. Braham was powerfully built. By the age of 15 he was 6 feet 1 inch (1.85 metres) and weighed around 12 to 13 stone (76 to 83 kilograms) and used his natural gifts to become a successful boxer. At 15 years and eight months he passed his School Certificate. His further education at Queen Elizabeth's Grammar School, Blackburn, Lancashire did not go well. He was frequently absent owing to his father's ministerial appointments which forced the family to continually relocate and consequently his concentration and grades declined. He left grammar school at the age of 16 after only a few months and did not return.

Braham struggled to find work in the era of the Great Depression. He considered moving abroad to join the Colonial Police in the British Overseas Territories and briefly entertained training as a sailor in the Merchant Navy. To gain experience he worked as a clerk in Wigan for the Wigan Borough Police. By 1937, tiring of life as an administrative clerk, Braham turned to the British armed forces for a more fulfilling career.

=== RAF training ===
Aged 17, Braham applied for a short service commission in the RAF, a course that lasted for five years. The commission was designed to find young aviation enthusiasts with the right physical and academic qualities to become flying officers. To Braham's surprise, his application was accepted. His commission was dated 7 March 1937. His service number was 40667. The commission enabled Braham to enter at the rank of pilot officer. His training mainly consisted of an introduction to flying by civilian organisations contracted to do so by the RAF. Successful candidates advanced to military training.

In December 1937 he began flight training at the No. 7 Elementary Flying School (EFS) at RAF Desford. It was normal for pilots to undertake solo flights after eight to eleven hours dual instruction with their flight instructor. For Braham, progress was slow and he made his first solo flight after 14 hours of dual instruction. On 9 March 1938 Braham flew solo for the first time in a Tiger Moth. In May 1938 Braham began officer instruction at RAF Uxbridge. After the completion of this course he was moved to RAF Shawbury to begin training on military aircraft. Now assigned to the No. 11 EFS he elected to become a fighter pilot and began training on the Hawker Hart. He completed his advanced flight training on 20 August 1938 and began the final phase of training in the Hawker Fury. He completed his training in formation flying, aerobatics and gunnery practice over the next four months, graduating in December 1938.

His first squadron was No. 29 Squadron RAF, based at RAF West Malling, flying the two-seater Hawker Demon. In February 1939 No 29 Squadron re-equipped with the Bristol Blenheim. Braham was disappointed at not being trained on the Hawker Hurricane and his reaction to this news was request a transfer which was refused. The squadron spent three months converting onto the Blenheim. In August 1939 No. 29 did convert to the Hurricane but upon the outbreak of war the squadron was reverted to the Blenheim as part of its reorientation to night fighter rather than daylight fighter operations. Braham soon earned the nickname 'Bob', which stayed with him throughout his service career. He had chosen this Christian name as his radio call sign to distinguish himself from the multitude of other Johns in the unit.

== Second World War ==
Some RAF squadrons were beginning to equip its aircraft with radar devices. This was a pioneering technology known as aircraft interception (AI) radar. It is unknown when, if, or how many of No 29 Squadron's Blenheim aircraft were fitted with them in 1940 as the squadron continued to practice, and struggle with, adapting to night-fighter tactics. A great many pilots relied on basic non-AI tactics which usually meant co-operating with search lights and using the aircrew's eyesight to seek out intruders. By the time Braham and his squadron were called upon to defend Britain from air attacks in August 1940, after the collapse of the Netherlands, Belgium and France in May–June 1940, British night fighter defences were very weak.

The difficulties of night fighting was evident in the performance of the night-fighter squadrons. One Fairey Battle was shot down in error by a Blenheim which could not correctly identify the aircraft; some other Blenheims crashed after being caught in the glare of search lights at low-level and return-fire from German bombers had inflicted at least one loss whilst 29 Squadron succeeded on bring down only one German aircraft. While identification friend or foe (IFF) devices had been fitted to some British aircraft they were not always switched on. Braham also experienced technical malfunctions in the Blenheims which prompted him to call into question their reliability. On one occasion the hydraulic pipe fractured in the Blenheim he was flying which caused the landing gear to fail and prompted Braham to force-land. At this time he was joined by his gunner/observer Bill Gregory with whom he was to fly frequently.

=== Home defence ===
By August 1940 the Battle of Britain was intensifying. Most of the battles thus far were in daylight, leaving night-fighter crews frustrated. Now based at RAF Digby in Lincolnshire and operating from the satellite airfield at Wellingore the unit formed part of No. 12 Group RAF defending British air space north of London. On the night of 24 August 1940 Braham took off and patrolled the Humberside area. The Blenheim was piloted by Braham, and contained air gunner Sergeant Wilsdon and aircraftman and trained radar operator N. Jacobson. Braham was directed to an aircraft held in searchlights but he closed too fast and overshot. His gunner succeeded in damaging the aircraft sufficiently and a searchlight crew saw it crash into the sea. It was identified as a Heinkel He 111. Braham's only other interaction with the enemy occurred at Ternhill, when a Junkers Ju 88 dropped bombs on the airfield destroying 13 Avro Ansons and damaged 20 more. Braham survived the attack uninjured.

In September 1940 29 Squadron began to convert to the Bristol Beaufighter, a rugged and heavily armed twin-engine aircraft equipped with aircraft interception (AI) radar in the shape of AI Mk. IV radar sets, just as the Luftwaffe began its campaign against British industrial cities—known as "The Blitz". By 29 November Squadron had become an all-Beaufighter unit. Braham was among the first to fly the Beaufighter and did so in September. He would, however, spend nearly the entire month hospitalised after a serious car accident. He flew his first wartime operation in a Beaufighter on 17 November 1940. Squadron Leader Guy Gibson, later famous for his role in Operation Chastise, led the mission. Braham flew nine operations in this month and enhanced his skills by completing a blind-flying course which taught pilots to fly in low-visibility conditions. For his service he was awarded the Distinguished Flying Cross (DFC) on 17 January 1941.

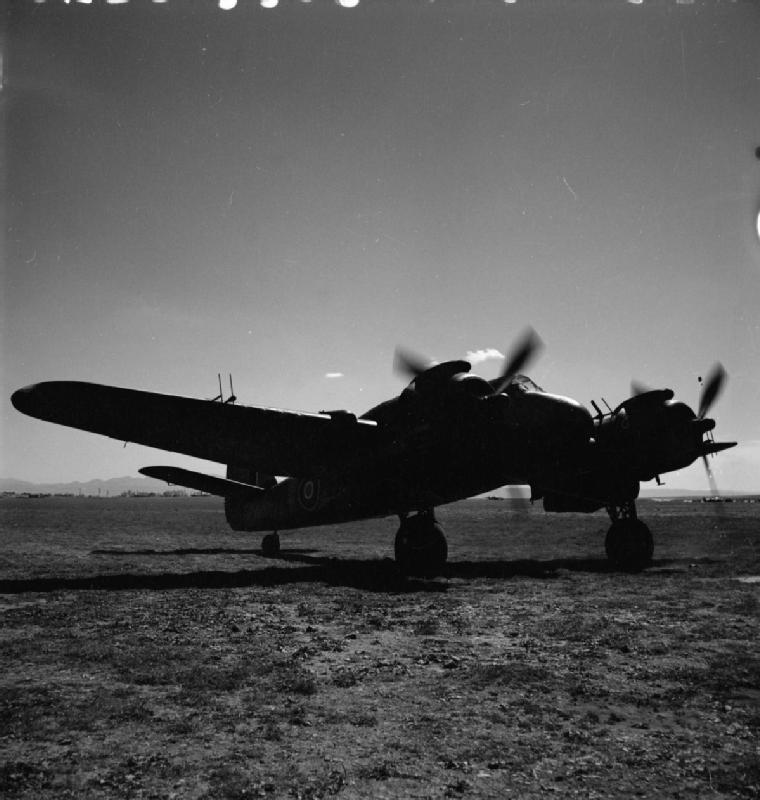
Beaufighter night fighter VIF of No. 255 Squadron RAF running up its engines c. 1943. The radar antennas are visible.

The combination of these developments eventually culminated in success. On 13 March 1941 Braham achieved a surprise attack on a Dornier Do 17, knocking out one of its engines before the cannons jammed. His radar operator, Sergeant Ross, eventually unjammed three of the guns. Braham's second burst blew the bomber up at a range of 60 yards and the Beaufighter narrowly avoided colliding with the debris. The engagement lasted 13 minutes. The two aircrew achieved another success on the 9 May. Approaching from slightly below their target, Braham followed his radar operator's instructions until a visual sighting had been made. Identifying an aircraft through a patch of eclipsed stars he could then position himself to attack. Attacking two He 111s he downed one with two close-range and short bursts of cannon fire. The victory was confirmed. The He 111 had crashed in neighbouring Richmond, London. The dead pilot's Iron Cross (Eisernes Kreuz) was sent to Braham and a souvenir along with two Luftwaffe lifejackets which he preferred to the bulkier British design. He wore the lifejacket until he was shot down.

The Blitz ended as the Luftwaffe moved its forces to support Operation Barbarossa and the invasion of the Soviet Union in June 1941 and air raids slackened. During the second half of 1941, small numbers of German aircraft made pinpoint attacks across Britain and German night fighters attempted intercept operations over England to disrupt RAF Bomber Commands bombing of Germany. On 23 June Braham claimed a probable against a He 111 which Royal Observer Corps personnel saw crash. But since he had lost contact with ground control (having wandered out of No. 29s area of operations) and fearing being lost or pursuing the He 111 too low into Barrage balloons, Braham ended the chase and claimed a probable. Records show only one claim was made that night by an RAF fighter other than Braham, and German records list two bombers failing to return.

Bill Gregory became Braham's regular radar operator on 6 July 1941. He gained another victory the next day on 7 July 1941 with the destruction of a Ju 88 and became an ace on 12 September shooting down a He 111 for his fifth victory. A Do 17 was claimed on 19 October followed by another He 111 on 24 October. By 25 November 1941 he had claimed 7 enemy aircraft and was awarded a bar to his DFC. He was then promoted to flight lieutenant. After having little leave in 1941, Braham was rested to prevent exhaustion. He was posted to No 51 OTU (Operational Training Unit) at RAF Cranfield on 28 January 1942.

Before he left for Cranfield Braham was involved in another car accident which removed him from duty. He was injured when the Austin 7 in which he was travelling left the road at speed. He had been on a night out celebrating his success. The five passengers (three officers and two girls) were all hurt, but one of the women later died in hospital. Once recovered Bob survived two scares on duty at Cranfield. On 13 March a Beaufighter's engines cut out forcing him to make an emergency landing, and on the same day, his second flight ended with the aircraft's engines catching fire. Braham managed to conduct a safe landing.

During this time Braham and Gregory frequently visited 29 Squadron at West Malling. By now the Germans were sending small-scale formations to bomb selected targets in Britain in what became known as the Baedeker Blitz. Operating on the night of 6/7 June 1942 in a borrowed Beaufighter, they destroyed a Dornier 217 raiding Canterbury and soon after Braham was posted back to No 29 Squadron from 51 OTU on 24 July 1942 as acting squadron leader and flight commander of the unit. After damaging a Ju 88 on 24 August he destroyed another on the 28th using Mark VII AI. The victory was witnessed by United States Army Air Force personnel on a visit to a radar station near the coast. On 29 August he attacked and destroyed a Ju 88 flying at 150 ft above the English Channel. Skilfully "hugging the waves" the Ju 88 pilot succeeded in making violent evasive manoeuvres. Although the German aircraft was damaged, momentarily the Beaufighter passed over the Ju 88 and was hit by a volley of defensive fire that caused the port engine to catch fire, forcing a crash landing near Beachy Head. Neither he nor his operator on that flight, Harry Jacobs, were injured though a bullet was found to have passed through Braham's seat, missing him by inches. He was awarded his DSO on 9 October 1942 with his tally standing at 10 enemy aircraft destroyed.

After receiving the award Braham was out celebrating at a pub. He attempted to drive home whilst intoxicated and crashed into a traffic island. Although drinking and driving was not a criminal offence, the police charged him with damaging public property and fined him £5, the equivalent of a week's wages. It was his third car crash. His success did not abate. A Ju 88 and Do 217 were claimed off the English coast on the nights of the 26 and 31 October 1942.

=== Night intruder ===
Braham had destroyed 12 enemy aircraft with one probable and four damaged and was one of the most successful RAF night fighter pilots. In recognition of his experience he was then given command of No. 141 Squadron RAF at RAF Ford on 23 December 1942 as a 22-year-old wing commander. With him went his AI operator Gregory, now a flying officer with the DFC and Distinguished Flying Medal. Three weeks later, on 20 January 1943, Braham claimed a Do 217.

No 141 Squadron's Beaufighter Mk.IF's moved to Cornwall in February 1943 to carry out night patrols over Brittany and France and daylight patrols over the Bay of Biscay and Atlantic Approaches to protect RAF Coastal Command aircraft. On 20 March 1943 he claimed a locomotive destroyed and soon afterwards was promoted to acting wing commander. In April Braham attacked a German E-Boat, firing 500 rounds of 20mm cannon at the target causing a large fire. On other operations Braham damaged three E-Boats while also strafing and damaging a U-boat.

In May 1943 No 141 Squadron moved to RAF Wittering. It had been chosen to be the first purpose-built night fighter squadron to operate over Germany and occupied Europe in the bomber support role. The Beaufighters were equipped with the new Serrate radar detector, which picked up the radar impulses given out by the German night fighter's' Lichtenstein radar. A number of Beaufighters were also equipped with Mk IV radar, but not the more effective and recently introduced Mark VII. Serrate operations started in June 1943 and were given greater impetus as the Battle of the Ruhr was intensifying and Bomber Command's losses to German night fighters increased. Braham had immediate success, destroying a Messerschmitt Bf 110 over the Netherlands on 14 June and another nine days later. A claim was also made for a damaged Ju 88 after Braham's guns had jammed. In between these two successes, Braham was awarded a second bar to his DFC on 15 June 1943. Throughout June, 141 Squadron claimed five enemy fighters destroyed and two damaged for the loss of one Beaufighter. Braham noted the continuous operations were tiring Gregory and he arranged for him to be rested as squadron operational planning officer. His replacement was Flight Lieutenant Harry "Jacko" Jacobs.

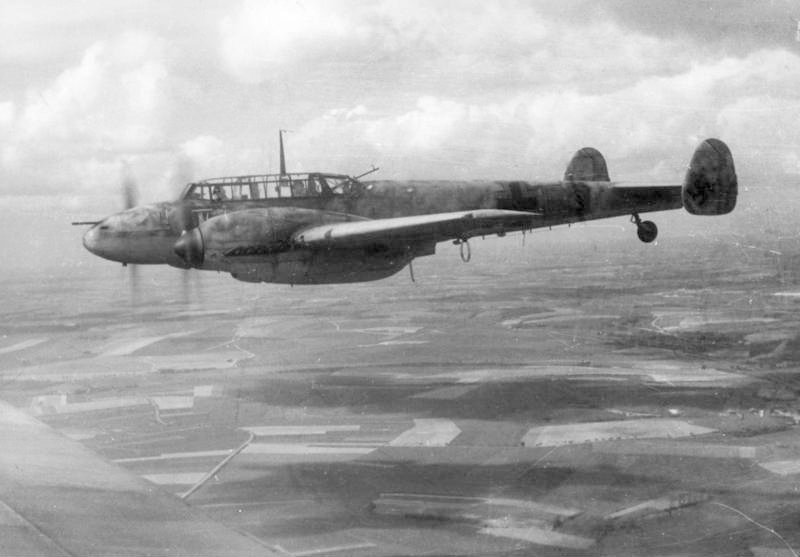
A Messerschmitt Bf 110: the Beaufighter's contemporary. Braham accounted for 6 of them in 1943.

His most successful intruder operation took place on the night of the 17/18 August 1943, when he participated in 100 Group's support of RAF Bomber Command's Operation Hydra. Braham had decided that it was best to employ the British night fighters in a freelance role. Instead of operating over known German airfields, he elected to interpose the Beaufighters between the outward bomber stream and German airfields in the Netherlands, Germany and Belgium. He hoped that the echoes made by the Beaufighters on the German Lichtenstein radar would attract enemy aircraft and divert them from the bombers.

Braham flew in the first wave. As Braham's wave reached Leeuwarden in the Netherlands and while four of the five RAF fighters made no contact, Braham attracted two enemy night fighters. The Messerschmitt Bf 110s were from IV./Nachtjagdgeschwader 1 (NJG 1—1st Night Fighter Wing). Five had taken off under the command of Heinz-Wolfgang Schnaufer—who finished the war as the most successful night fighter of all time with 121 air victories. Schnaufer led his flight out toward the echo but turned back himself after engine trouble. Using his Serrate radar detector, Braham and his radar operator picked up the emissions made by the German fighters' Lichtenstein radar. He gained on and shot down Feldwebel Georg Kraft, an Experten with 15 air victories from 4./NJG 1. Kraft was killed. Another Bf 110 had witnessed the action and attempted to engage Braham but was outmanoeuvred and dispatched also. Its pilot, Feldwebel Heinz Vinke was the only member of his crew to survive. Braham considered shooting at one crew member, likely Vinke, who he had seen parachute out of the aircraft, but Bill Gregory persuaded him not to. Braham's Beaufighter was nearly struck by debris from the last victim. Braham had a habit of opening fire at very close range and the resulting disintegration of the Messerschmitt hurled debris at the closely following Beaufighter. One reason for firing at close-range was Braham's high state of fatigue. In such a state Braham could barely keep his eyes open. Whenever he peered ahead they smarted and misted.

Braham was not satisfied with his current score-rate and lack of action in September 1943. Consequently, he flew a number of missions against ground targets. Successful night fighter pilots were ordered not to engage in such activities that exposed them to excessive risk. On one particular mission he decided to hunt enemy rail transport after failing to find enemy aircraft. On the Dieppe to Paris line he intercepted a locomotive which exploded after being hit. He attacked another but struck some trees which damaged the underside of the fuselage. Braham maintained control and flew home. It was not unusual for him to return with strange defections caused by collisions with objects. After one sortie against shipping the armourers were drenched in salt water and seaweed when they opened the panel housing the cannons with the intention of replacing spent ammunition.

Braham was awarded the first bar to his DSO on 24 September 1943. Four nights later, on the 28/29 September whilst carrying out an intruder operation between Celle and Hanover Braham encountered what he identified to be a Do 217 which engaged him in a dogfight. He downed the enemy aircraft which hit the ground and exploded. He then gained another contact on an enemy aircraft but could not quite catch it then witnessed a crash or explosion nearby. One source suggests the victim of the crash was German ace Hans-Dieter Frank (55 victories), flying a Heinkel He 219, who collided with another German fighter while trying to evade Braham. The very next night he claimed a Bf 110. His victim was identified as German ace August Geiger of IV./NJG 1 (53 victories). Geiger parachuted out of his fighter but drowned. Within minutes Braham fired on a Ju 88 which he claimed as damaged. Frank, Vinke and Geiger were the 17th, 18th and 19th most successful night fighter aces of the Second World War (and aerial warfare).

Against his wishes Braham was rested from operations and posted from No 141 Squadron on 1 October 1943 to attend a staff officer course at Camberley. Braham resisted the move as much as he could. He complained directly to Air Marshal Roderick Hill, commanding Fighter Command at that time. Hill refused to countenance Braham's request and denied his plea for one last operation. Within days Braham was posted to No. 9 Group RAF.

=== Daylight intruder ===
For three months Braham remained inactive. In February 1944 he was posted to No. 2 Group RAF as 'wing commander night operations' attached to the 2nd Light Bomber Group, RAF Second Tactical Air Force. Although a staff officer at HQ, Braham was able, with persistence, to persuade his commanding officer, Air Vice Marshal Basil Embry to allow him to 'free-lance' intruder operations using a De Havilland Mosquito borrowed from one of the various squadrons in the group on the proviso he asked his permission beforehand. Braham also had his former radar operators transferred to the group's headquarters so he could fly with them. He frequently borrowed aircraft from No. 613 Squadron RAF.

On 28 February 1944 he took off and claimed a German lorry destroyed south of Paris in a daylight sortie. The Mosquitoes did not carry radar but were fitted with Gee navigational aids. It allowed for accurate navigation but night sorties would not be fruitful since the location of enemy aircraft would be exceptionally difficult. For Braham, hunting in daylight was a strange experience. On 5 March 1944 he flew with Bill Gregory on a 900-mile trip around northern France. The weather impeded his attempts to shoot up airfields at Orléans and Bourges, so he proceeded to the aerodrome at Châteaudun. He spotted a Heinkel He 177 flying in the landing circuit at 800 feet. He closed rapidly and dispatched it for his 20th air victory. Braham was denied the chance to operate as a night fighter pilot at this time when there was intense activity. In January 1944 the Luftwaffe initiated Operation Steinbock, a series of strikes against British cities in response to the British offensive over Germany. The German air arm met with severe losses during the operation.

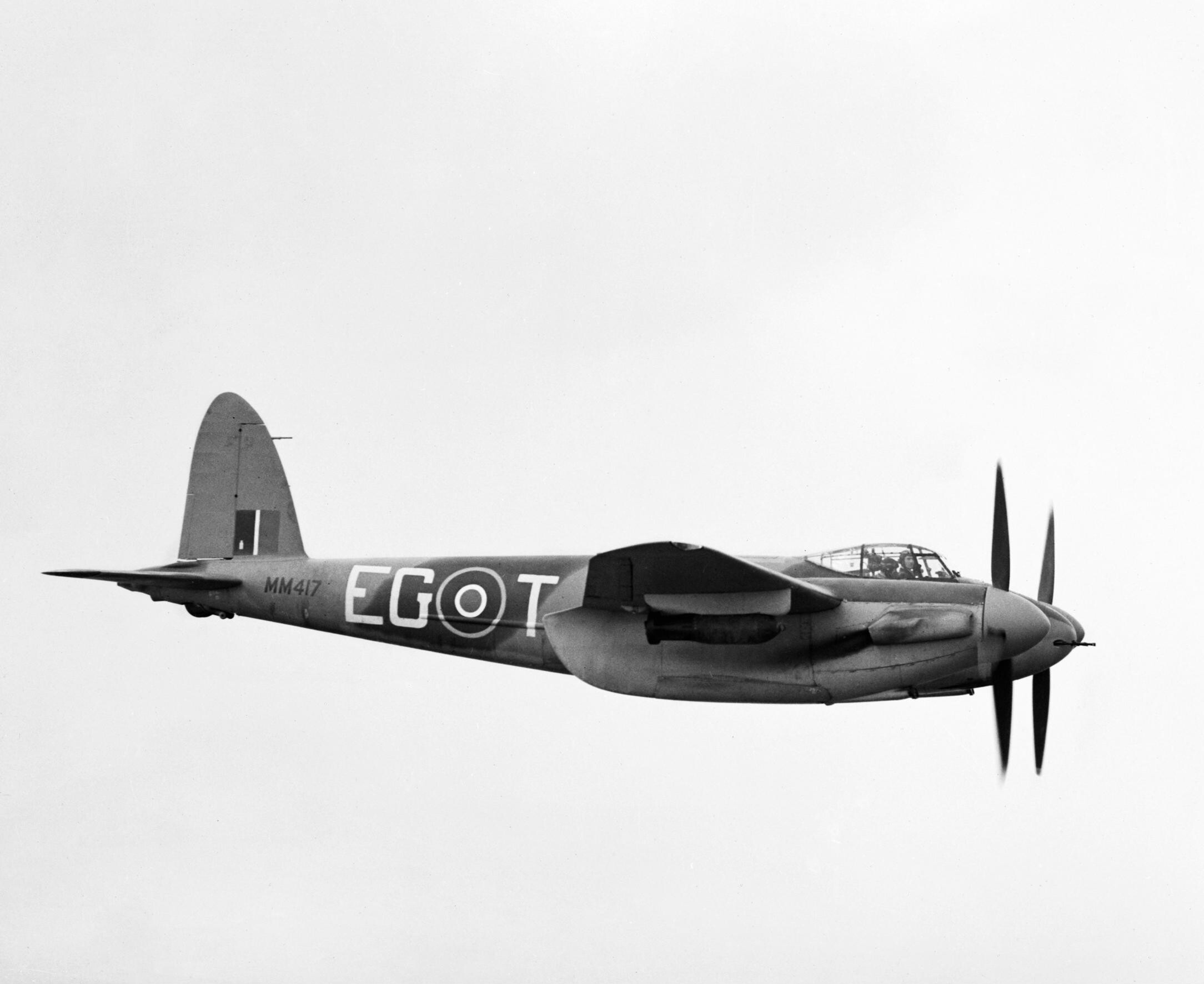
The Mosquito fighter: Braham would have used these types in ranger operations.

On 12 March Braham and Gregory were returning from a 1000-mile trip and were hit by ground fire over Bayeux. They nursed the Mosquito back to England on one engine—the other having burned out. Just two days later he attended Buckingham Palace where he was awarded a second bar to his DFC from George VI. Both Braham's wife Joan and his father attended.

Ten days later he received permission for another daylight sortie. Squadron Leader Robertson joined him on this occasion as his flight engineer. He flew to Lasham to pick up a Mosquito. His target on this occasion would be Denmark. The Luftwaffe kept a number of operational units in the region so he flew to Coltishall in Norfolk to be nearer his destination and conserve fuel during the sortie. Near Aalborg he sighted two aircraft. So far away from the battle zones, the Germans did not expect to be attacked by the enemy. Neither made much attempt to defend themselves. The first, a Junkers W 34 transport, was shot down and the second, a Junkers Ju 52, tried a crash-landing only to nose-over and crumple the wings. Braham strafed it to ensure destruction. His gun cameras filmed the action during which he fired 320 rounds. On 4 April he returned to France. Lacking radar, Braham sought out large airfields to be sure of intercepting an enemy aircraft. He flew to Bordeaux looking for He 177s that intelligence suggested were operating against Atlantic convoys from Bordeaux–Mérignac. Braham only encountered a Bücker Bü 131 which fell victim after a brief burst of fire.

Nine days later Braham returned to Denmark. On this occasion a No. 305 Polish Bomber Squadron Mosquito was borrowed from the Polish. On the mission he encountered a He 111 near Esjberg. It was circling a lighthouse at 300 feet. Braham fired a three-second burst, and the He 111 caught fire and nose-dived into the sea, exploding on impact. A Focke-Wulf Fw 58 trainer followed as his second victory on this mission. Meanwhile, the Germans had tracked the Mosquito by radar. Two Messerschmitt Bf 109s appeared on the scene soon afterwards. The cloud base was only at 1,000 feet and he effected his escape by hiding in its folds. One of the Bf 109s fired some ineffectual bursts of fire at Braham and he also encountered some light ground fire. He flew directly to Group HQ at Benson. He returned the Mosquito the following day. Some days later, Braham returned to 305 to pick up a Mosquito and joined No. 107 Squadron RAF in a raid against Paris even though he had no formal bomber pilot training. Nine days later near Poitiers, Braham was engaged in a ground attack mission. He spotted a Focke-Wulf Fw 190 carrying a drop tank and under-wing rockets at low-level. He fired at 600 yards as the enemy accelerated to escape. His fire slowed the Fw 190; catching up with it, the Fw 190 was hit again and crashed: its wreckage strewn over three fields. The Focke-Wulf was his 27th victory.

There was evidence that Braham's judgement was becoming impaired. He had not taken much leave since the war began in 1939 and he admitted to becoming short-tempered with his family and those around him. He had spent much of the previous two years leading from the front and flying long and hazardous operations over enemy territory. On 7 May 1944 he collected navigator Flight Lieutenant Donald Walsh from Group headquarters. He borrowed a Mosquito from 21 Squadron at Gravesend. He flew to Norfolk to refuel and spent time with his old unit, 141 Squadron, and spent the night at West Raynham. Over Roskilde, Denmark, he caught a Ju 88 after a 10-minute chase and shot it down—his 28th victory. On 12 May Braham repeated the operation. This time he took Bill Gregory with him. Operating over the Aalborg–Copenhagen line he spotted a Fw 190 near Hurning. Giving chase Braham found himself under attack by a Bf 109—his presence clearly detected by German radar. His Mosquito was hit in the port wing and the fuel line were ruptured. The Bf 109 then disappeared. Ignoring the damage he closed on the Fw 190. At zero feet his Mosquito bounced off a mound but he managed to hit the enemy aircraft which burst into flames, stalled and crashed near Aalborg. The range was so close—around 100 yards—the Focke-Wulf nearly collided with Braham. The loss of fuel from the chase and damage coupled with his damaged propellers upon his collision with the ground, meant that the chances of reaching England were slim. He climbed to high altitude 70 miles from the coast and broadcast an emergency message which was received. He ditched the Mosquito which broke in half. They took the dingy and watched the tail and wings remain afloat. He was retrieved with Gregory by air-sea rescue. Royal Navy trawlers sank the sections of aircraft remaining afloat. Regardless of the venture, on 13 June 1944 he received his final award—a second bar to his DSO.

Braham was summoned to see Basil Embry. The commanding officer made Braham wait until he had cleaned himself up and was properly dressed. Embry gave Braham a stern rebuke for risking himself in such a fashion. He had not given his agreement to the operation and Braham had taken off before he could give a definitive answer. Nevertheless, his 29th victory eased the tension and Embry invited him to the bar for a conciliatory beer. Bill Gregory did not fly with Bob Braham again. His DFC and bar with DFM reflected his contribution to Braham's success. He may also have taken the events of 12 May 1944 as a warning. For Braham, the thrill of ranger operations was addictive. On 25 May 1944 he attempted another but turned back because of poor weather. His last operations were flown with both Embry and Walsh on 6 June 1944 during the Normandy landings. The Western Front, dormant since 1940, was now re-activated. Braham flew over Normandy several times with Mosquito bomber groups in June 1944. These counted as his last successful operations.

=== Prisoner of war ===
Unlike Gregory, Braham was unperturbed by the events of 12 May 1944. Braham believed that while the war continued a trained combat pilot must engage the enemy at all costs. His experience allowed him a greater chance to survive the odds than a new pilot but he acknowledged his fortune could not last forever. Braham continued to fly operations deep into enemy airspace over Denmark, alone, and in daylight.

On 25 June 1944 he collected a Mosquito from 21 Squadron and the Australian navigator Don Walsh and then flew to Norfolk to refuel at West Raynham. They took off and headed to the Danish coast. Out-to-sea he spotted, and was likely seen, by German coastal ships. As they neared land Braham and Walsh noticed a slight whine in the aircraft's radio speakers meaning the Mosquito was being tracked by radar. To make it difficult for the enemy to track him he changed course frequently. Ranger operations depended on surprise, but it had clearly been lost. The clouds were thinning out and visibility was improving. Braham decided it was now a folly to continue and decided to head for home. While flying over Funen island he spotted a building with a big Swastika flag draped from a pole. A car was parked outside the entrance. Believing it might contain someone of importance, he dived to attack, strafing the building and destroyed the car.

After departing the area he reached the west coast, but Braham had loitered for too long. He spotted two Fw 190s approaching fast from the east. Braham had shot down two of these machines in a Mosquito but he was uncertain of how experienced these pilots had been. There was no cloud cover and the Mosquito could not outrun the faster and more agile single-engine fighters for long. He decided to turn and fight while he still could. In a head-on attack the first Fw 190 pilot missed but the second struck the port wing and engine with cannon fire causing a large fire. The instrument panel and cockpit window was shot through missing both Walsh and Braham by inches. Braham dived to the sea levelling out below 100 feet. He tried to use the fire extinguisher to stop the fire. The German pilot shared Braham's philosophy of ensuring a kill by shooting at an enemy aircraft until it came down. The Mosquito was hit again and Braham crash-landed his aircraft onto a beach at 150 miles per hour.

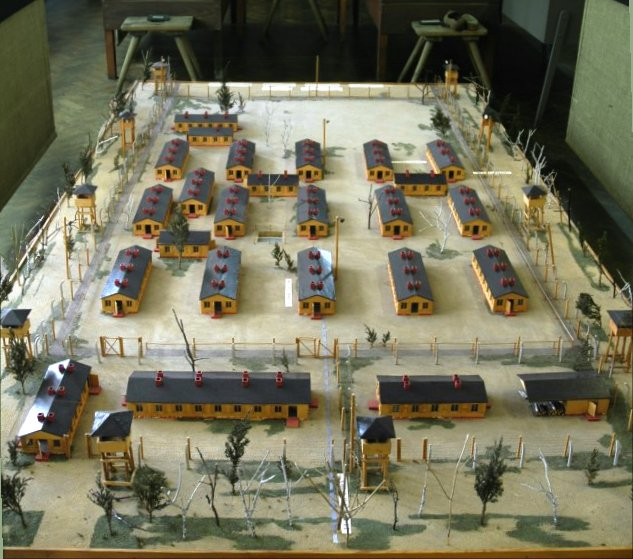
A model of Stalag Luft III, 1945.

Braham and Walsh scrambled free of the Mosquito and hid behind a sand dune. As they did so the aircraft's fuel tanks exploded. The Fw 190 pilot flew over at 20 feet and for a moment they believed he was going to fire upon them. To their relief he waved and flew by. They contemplated escape but instantly German soldiers were running towards them. They had crash-landed near a radar station and the enemy soldiers were at the crash site very quickly. The Germans fired a few shots in their direction but none hit them. They were captured and searched. The Germans found a Mauser pistol which Braham had taken from a crashed German bomber. It was not well received by his captors. Braham believed they might attack him and he had thought about grabbing the gun, fighting it out with the German guards, finding a friendly Dane and making it to Sweden somehow. The tension eased when he was taken to a barracks and offered some synthetic German coffee. Soon a pair of Luftwaffe officers arrived and escorted him to a cell on an airfield near Esjberg.

Braham and Walsh were taken across the border by train to Germany and sent to the Luftwaffe interrogation centre at Oberursel, near Frankfurt. Along the journey the train stopped because of air raids throughout the day and night. The German guards made it clear they had disdain for the British airmen. When civilians saw them in the carriages and the stations insults and death threats were shouted at them. Joseph Goebbels, the Reich Propaganda Minister, had painted all British and Allied airmen as "terror flyers" and his message resonated with civilians. At one point, a group of drunk German soldiers threatened them with bayonets and tried forcing their way into the carriage of the over-crowded train. Braham feared for his life but the situation was restored when a young SS officer shouted an order and put a stop to it.

At the interrogation centre he was poorly fed and physically weakened. It was part of the German technique for weakening resistance to interrogation. The Germans had prepared a file on all famous RAF personnel based on information from British newspapers. They knew most of what had happened in his career and private life. While there, he was interrogated by the aide of Reichsmarshall Hermann Göring. The German questioned him about British defences and Supermarine Spitfires, as he was about to resume operations on Ju 88s. Jokingly, Braham advised him to steer clear of Spitfires. While at Oberursel the pilot who had shot him down—Leutnant Robert Spreckels of Jagdgeschwader 1 (JG 1—1st Fighter Wing)— arrived to meet him. Braham was one of his 12 air victories; a figure of 45 is often misquoted. An interpreter was provided. Braham promised to buy him a whisky when the Allies won the war. The statement came as a shock to Spreckels who believed firmly in a German victory. Braham came to respect Spreckels, their differences aside. He learned that Spreckels had lost his parents in a British air attack and was surprised when the German dismissed the fact with the words "it is the war." Both fighter pilots dissociated themselves with the bomber war. They shook hands and parted.

The airmen were sent to Stalag Luft III, a Luftwaffe prisoner of war camp near Sagan in Germany near the Polish border. They remained there until 27 January 1945 when the advance of the Red Army forced them to march across Germany. They were fed by the Red Cross parcels and the civilian population who were also fleeing the Soviets. Near the village of Jamlitz, a Panzer Division, recently out of action, shared their rations with them. They reached Spremberg on 2 February 1945 where they received food and hot water from the depot of the 8th Panzer Division. They reached Bremen on 5 February 1945. The success of the British Army in north-western Europe necessitated their evacuation to Lübeck on 10 April. They were liberated by elements of the British Army on 2 May 1945.

== Postwar career ==
Braham's return to Britain was not a welcome one. His family found him exceptionally difficult to live with. His short temper and aggression manifested themselves when journalists came to the family's home in Leicestershire searching for a war-story to print. Braham, who despised publicity, physically ejected them from his property. His decision to shut the media out of his life likely explains why, even as one of the most successful aces, he was virtually unknown in Britain outside the RAF. Braham had also become despondent about the political climate in a country that reduced Winston Churchill to Leader of the Opposition, where the black market was rife and rationing was set to become an indefinite feature of post-war Britain into the 1950s.

Braham stayed in the RAF and joined the Night Fighter Development Wing of the Central Fighter Establishment where he tested and developed existing and new night fighting equipment. The massive disarmament and reduction of the RAF—mimicking that of the early 1920s—disillusioned Braham even more. Flying was reduced to save costs and removed the one activity that had drawn him into the RAF in 1937. Initially he still managed regular flights to Belgium, where the RAF retained large bases. While there he was awarded the Order of the Crown and Croix de guerre with Palm for his wartime work. The arrangement was short-lived when the Central Fighter Establishment was cut by half. Coupled with rationing and a declining standard of living and low-wages, Braham resigned from the RAF in March 1946 and applied to join the Rhodesian Colonial Police. Bill Gregory heard of Braham's decision and contacted Basil Embry, Braham's former commanding officer. Embry soon persuaded him to return to the RAF at the rank of flight lieutenant with the pay of an acting wing commander. There followed a period of two years of non-flying appointments in the Air Ministry in London.

In May 1952 he resigned from the RAF for the second time. Braham decided he could not afford to pay for his three sons' private education on a wing commander's salary in Britain. He joined the Royal Canadian Air Force (RCAF) with the rank of wing commander and on much better pay. On 6 June 1952 the Brahams sailed to Canada and Braham was immediately appointed staff officer for operations and training at Air Defence near Montreal. He taught aircrew how to fly, carry out interceptions and fight in all types of weather. He flew the fast Avro Canada CF-100 Canuck on 39 occasions and North American F-86 Sabre as well as the Lockheed T-33. Altogether he flew 193 times with the RCAF. His next appointment was to CFB North Bay, 200 miles north of Toronto, at the No. 3 All-Weather (Fighter) Operational Training Unit.

Between October 1957 and July 1960, Braham commanded No. 432 Squadron flying the Avro Canada CF-100. While there he was involved in a mid-air collision, losing a wing and unable to jettison the canopy. He ejected through the canopy, parachuting to safety but sustaining back and head injuries. In the summer 1960, the family moved to Paris, when he was appointed senior officer at Supreme Headquarters Allied Powers in Europe (SHAPE). Braham flew when he could. He would patrol the skies over Belgium, West Germany and Luxembourg in variants of the Lockheed F-104 Starfighter and English Electric Lightning. His tenure at SHAPE ended in 1964.

In 1961 he accepted an invitation from Robert Spreckels, his victor on 25 June 1944 air battle, to Germany. Spreckels had attempted to locate Braham for some years. While in England on business for a Hamburg shipping firm, he learned Braham had survived the war and was still alive. He persuaded the German consul in Bath to forward a letter to him. Correspondence followed from 1956 but it was only in 1961 that the circumstances permitted a meeting. Spreckels had learned English sufficiently to allow for two to communicate. Braham wrote in Scramble, "Robert Spreckels became, in spite of world tension and hatreds, one who is counted among my company of friends."

For the remainder of his career, Braham flew around the World but, in 1968, Canadian policy pointed to the amalgamation of all the Canadian armed forces. Worse still, the cancellation of the Avro Canada CF-105 Arrow put an end to Canada's plan to build their own fighters which curbed Braham's ambitions as a test pilot. He resigned from the RCAF in January 1968 and settled in Nova Scotia with his wife and three sons. He had flown 5,370 hours in 66 types of aircraft with the RCAF.

Only 48, Braham was not willing to retire. He had always been interested in history and so he joined the Historic Sites Department of the Department of Indian Affairs and Northern Development. He became an area superintendent and served for five years. In December 1973 he experienced a sudden onset of headaches and complained of nausea. He was admitted to hospital but his health declined rapidly. Bob Braham died from a brain tumour on 7 February 1974 at the age of 53.

== Personal life ==
Braham's father, Reverend Dr E.P Braham, was an RAF chaplain. His mother was a housewife but she suddenly contracted pneumonia and died on 13 December 1941. By coincidence it was the same night that Braham was involved in a car accident in which a young woman died. In 1941 Braham met Joan Hyde on a night out. Within a few months they were married by Braham's father in Duxford on 15 April 1941 just nine days after his 21st birthday. Beaufighters from 29 Squadron were granted permission for a low-fly past to celebrate. They planned a honeymoon in Somerset but the war interrupted it and Braham was returned to his unit. Reverend Braham died at roughly 60 years old in 1951. The marriage to Joan produced three sons. The eldest, Michael, entered the Royal Military College of Canada and became a captain in the Royal Canadian Navy, retiring in 1987 and starting a twenty-year career as a civilian in the Department of National Defence. Robert became a colonial police officer in Southern Rhodesia and subsequently a police officer in the Royal Canadian Mounted Police, as did his youngest son, David. Joan Braham died in January 2012.

== List of victories ==
Chronicle of aerial victories
Can be identified with certainty
| Claim No. | Date | Time | Flying | Enemy type | Details |
| 1. | 25 August 1940 | Night | Bristol Blenheim | Heinkel He 111 | The He 111P, code GI+CT, belonged to 9. Staffel, III./Kampfgeschwader 55 (KG 55—55th Bomber Wing). It crashed into the Humber river at 01:30. Pilot Unteroffizier Alois Schmaderer and his three crewmen; Leutnant Gustav Jerusel, Gefreiter Walter Klesatschek, Feldwebel Paul Neidel, and war correspondent Hans Alt killed in action. It is a point of dispute which RAF pilot was responsible for shooting the bomber down. Some sources credit this victory to James Sanders of No. 615 Squadron RAF. Although KG 55 records record only one He 111 lost in that area that night and not over the Humber—supporting the Sanders claim—searchlights did witness an aircraft crash into the river at the time of the battle with Braham. |
| 2. | 13 March 1941 | Night | Bristol Beaufighter | Dornier Do 17 | Claimed north of Wells at 21:45. The claim was made during the night of the Clydebank Blitz, with supporting German air operations flown throughout the British Isles. RAF claims on this night amount to nine destroyed, one probable and four damaged. Braham's victory has since been identified as a Stab./Kampfgeschwader 2 (KG 2—2nd Bomber Wing) aircraft on route to attack Hull. The Do 17Z-2,Werknummer—factory number 4248 code 'U5+DA', fell to earth six miles off Wells-next-the-Sea. Oberleutnant H von Keiser, Leutnant B Meyer, and Feldwebel's Heinz Genahr and Rucker were all killed—the latter's body washed ashore in June 1941. |
| 3. | 9 May 1941 | Night | Bristol Beaufighter | Heinkel He 111 | Claimed over Wimbledon at 00:05. Identified as He 111H-5, Werknummer 4019, code 1G+MK, belonging to 2./Kampfgeschwader 27 (KG 27—27th Bomber Wing). Crashed near Richmond, Wimbledon Common. Leutnant D Stähle, Obergefreiter F. Senft, H. Berner, and A. Weitz were all killed. |
| 4. | 7 July 1941 | Night | Bristol Beaufighter | Junkers Ju 88 | Claimed at 01:10 over the Thames Estuary. Ju 88s are known to have been reported missing after this night; 3./Kampfgeschwader 30 and 3./Küstenfliegergruppe 106 reported losses. |
| 5. | 12 September 1941 | Night | Bristol Beaufighter | Heinkel He 111 | Claimed 10 miles south east of Dover. |
| 6. | 19 October 1941 | Night | Bristol Beaufighter | Dornier Do 17 | Claimed 15 miles off Foreland at 21:00. |
| 7. | 24 October 1941 | Night | Bristol Beaufighter | Heinkel He 111 | Claimed at 18:00 off Great Yarmouth. Identified as Ju 88, 4D+DA, Werknummer 4242 belonging to Erpro./Kampfgeschwader 30 which crashed off Lowestoft at 18:00. Unteroffizier F. Hall, T Möschler, K. Winter, and Obergefreiter H. Zettier were all killed. |
| 8. | 7 June 1942 | Night | Bristol Beaufighter | Dornier Do 217 | Claimed at 03:00 15 miles east of Sandwich, Kent. The claim was made during a raid by III./Kampfgeschwader 2 (KG 2—2nd Bomber Wing) against Canterbury. The machine was likely from this unit. |
| 9. | 10 August 1942 | Night | Bristol Beaufighter | Dornier Do 217 | Claimed at 00:10 40 miles north east of Foreness Point. Identified as Do 217E-4 Werknummer 4242 from 2. Staffel from KG 2 crashed into the North Sea. Pilot Feldwebel Georg Zsckelmayer, Unteroffizier Johann Ferne and Unteroffizier Günther Schröter killed. The body of Unteroffizier Ulrich Lossack was recovered from the sea two months later. |
| 10. | 28 August 1942 | Night | Bristol Beaufighter | Junkers Ju 88 | Claimed off Beachy Head. Kampfgeschwader 77 (KG 77—77th Bomber Wing) was in action in this area in August 1942 and on the 28th was involved in unspecified operations over England. On 31 August 1942 it was re-designated I./Kampfgeschwader 6 (KG 6—6th Bomber Wing). A Ju 88 of 3.(F)/33 was shot down by a No. 29 Squadron Beaufighter. |
| 11. | 26 October 1942 | Day | Bristol Beaufighter | Junkers Ju 88 | Claimed 25 miles off Beachy Head on a daylight operation. A Ju 88 from 3. Staffel of Aufklärungsgruppe 123 was lost off Beachy Head on this night. |
| 12. | 31 October 1942 | Night | Bristol Beaufighter | Dornier Do 217 | Claimed seven miles off East Foreland. Claim was made during a 57-aircraft raid on Canterbury. KG 2 and I./Kampfgeschwader 6 took part in the attack. |
| 13. | 21 January 1943 | Night | Bristol Beaufighter | Dornier Do 217 | Claimed 10 miles south west of Dungeness at 01:00. |
| 14. | 14 June 1943 | Night | Bristol Beaufighter | Messerschmitt Bf 110 | Claimed over Stavoren in the Netherlands. Only one Bf 110 was shot down on this night, which crashed near Heinsberg. Bf 110 G-4 Werknummer 4879, G9+FN of 5. Staffel of Nachtjagdgeschwader 1 (NJG 1—1st Night Fighter Wing). Oberfeldwebel Fritz Schellwat and Rudolf Lüdeke escaped uninjured. Schellwat, the pilot, had claimed his 13th (of 17) victory at 01:32 and was shot down soon after. German loss records, are however, incomplete. |
| 15. | 25 June 1943 | Night | Bristol Beaufighter | Messerschmitt Bf 110 | Claimed near Gilze-Rijen Air Base. Seven Bf 110s were shot down, damaged or crash landed after combat with enemy fighters on this night. The following losses occurred over the Netherlands; Werknummer 6157 from 3./NJG 1 was destroyed; Werknummer 4862 of 7./NJG 1 destroyed; Werknummer 5454 belonging to 10./Nachtjagdgeschwader 4 (NJG 4—4th Night Fighter Wing) crash landed. |
| 16. | 9 August 1943 | Night | Bristol Beaufighter | Messerschmitt Bf 110 | Claimed near Sint-Truiden Air Base. Two losses over Belgium on this night; Werknummer 5536 belonging to III./Nachtjagdgeschwader 3 (NJG 3—3rd Night Fighter Wing) crash landed pilot unhurt; Werknummer 6272 code 3C+LJ belonging to I./NJG 4 destroyed. Crew Hauptmann Alred Haesler (5 claims) wounded, Feldwebel Anton Werzinski and ? Heniz unhurt. Though reported Haesler bailed from his Bf 110 after an engine fire on takeoff from Morialme airfield. He struck one of the vertical stabilisers, and his leg was amputated. |
| 17. | 18 August 1943 | Night | Bristol Beaufighter | Messerschmitt Bf 110 | Claimed off the Dutch coast. Identified as Bf 110G-4Werknummer "G9+EZ" of 12./NJG 1 flown by Feldwebel Georg Kraft (15 victories). Kraft killed in action. Kraft's operator Uffz. Rudolf Dunger survived. Dunger later served as operator to Braham's second victim that night, Heinz Vinke. The pair were later killed in action in February 1944. |
| 18. | 18 August 1943 | Night | Bristol Beaufighter | Messerschmitt Bf 110 | Claimed off the Dutch coast. Identified as Bf 110G-4 Werknummer 4874 "G9+BY" of 11./NJG 1 flown by Feldwebel Heinz Vinke (54 victories). Vinke survived, his radio operators were killed. For unknown reasons Vinke was flying with two other crew members; Unteroffizier Johann Gaa and Bordfunker, Feldwebel Karl Schodl. Both were wounded and bailed out, but subsequently died in the sea from exposure. Vinke was rescued after 18 hours. |
| 19. | 28 September 1943 | Night | Bristol Beaufighter | Dornier Do 217 | Claimed a Do 217 in the Hanover area. One source concluded Braham was most likely to have caused Hauptmann Hans-Dieter Frank (55 victories)—who was flying a Heinkel He 219 in the area—to crash. It is also thought Frank may have collided with a Bf 110 during an interception near Hanover. |
| 20. | 30 September 1943 | Night | Bristol Beaufighter | Messerschmitt Bf 110 | Claimed over the Netherlands. Identified as Bf 110G-4 Werknummer 5477 "G9+ER" flown by Hauptmann August Geiger (53 victories) of 7./NJG 1. Geiger baled out over Zuiderzee but drowned. His radar and radio operator Feldwebel Dietrich Koch was also killed in action. Geiger's Bf 110 was found in 1971 and identified as his in 1986. The tail fin displays battle damage. |
| 21. | 5 March 1944 | Day | de Havilland Mosquito | Heinkel He 177 | Claimed over Châteaudun Air Base. One He 177 was certainly lost on this night, during Operation Steinbock, over Châteaudun whilst on a non-operational flight. The He 177A-3 Werknummer 332214 "5J+AL" from 3. Staffel (squadron) Kampfgeschwader 100 (KG 100—100th Bomber Wing) was flown by Leutnant Wilhelm Werner, Unteroffizier Kolomann Schlögl, Unteroffizier Gustave Birkenmaier, Unteroffizier Alfred Zwieselsberger and Unteroffizier Josef Kerres. All the crew were killed. Wing Commander EFF Lambert from No. 515 Squadron RAF made a claim for a He 177 that night, but his claim was made 8 miles west of Melun. |
| 22. | 24 March 1944 | Day | de Havilland Mosquito | Junkers Ju 52 | Claimed near Aalborg, Denmark. Identified as Werknummer 7509, code DP+EH, belonging to Flugzeugführerschule B 31 (Flying Leader School). Hauptman Fritz Müller, Gefreiter Robert Gangl were wounded while Kurt Halbedel was killed. |
| 23. | 24 March 1944 | Day | de Havilland Mosquito | Junkers W 34 | Claimed near Aalborg, Denmark. Identified as Ju W 34 Werknummer 1436 of Gruppe Adj Bordfliegergruppe 196. The aircraft was hit on the starboard wing, caught fire and crashed to the ground near Tranders, Denmark. The entire crew perished; Gruppenkommandeur (Group Commander) Oberstleutnant Gerrit Wiegmink, Pilot; Unteroffizier Friedrich Brüske, Hauptmann Ernst Gallmann and Unteroffizier Martin Liess. |
| 24. | 4 April 1944 | Day | de Havilland Mosquito | Bücker Bü 131 | Location and time not recorded in Braham's log book. |
| 25. | 13 April 1944 | Day | de Havilland Mosquito | Heinkel He 111 | Location and time not recorded in Braham's log book. |
| 26. | 13 April 1944 | Day | de Havilland Mosquito | Focke-Wulf Fw 58 | Identified as belonging to IV./Fliegerzielgeschwader 1. Aircraft destroyed. Two of the crew were unwounded. The third, Otto Frölich, was wounded. |
| 27. | 29 April 1944 | Day | de Havilland Mosquito | Focke-Wulf Fw 190 | Claimed north west of Poitiers. Braham's report stated it was carrying a drop tank and rockets under the wing – possibly on a special operation. Jagdgeschwader 26 (JG 26—26th Fighter Wing) lost one Fw 190A-6, Werknummer 530735 "White 12", on a ferry flight west of Poitiers at this time. German records did not state the cause of the loss. The pilot, Oberfeldwebel Willi Kalitzki was killed. |
| 28. | 7 May 1944 | Day | de Havilland Mosquito | Junkers Ju 88 | Claimed west of Roskilde in Denmark. Identified as Ju 88A-5 "4D+GV", Werknummer 2432, belonging to 11./Kampfgeschwader 30 (KG 30—30th Bomber Wing) was destroyed. Oberfeldwebel Karl Soldau managed to parachute to safety slightly wounded. Gefreiter Werner Stark and Unteroffizier Kurt Stephan were killed when their parachutes did not open. Oberfeldwebel Paul Berlinke's remains were found in the wreck. The crew was buried in Vestre Cemetery. |
| 29. | 12 May 1944 | Day | de Havilland Mosquito | Focke-Wulf Fw 190 | Claimed near Herning in Denmark. The tail section was seen by radio operator Gregory to disintegrate and the Fw 190 crashed into a river bank. |
