= Robert Braham =

English editor

Robert Braham (fl. 1555) was an English editor.

== Works ==
In 1555, he edited The Auncient Historic and onely trewe and syncere Cronicle of the warres betwixte the Grecians and the Troyans … translated into Englyshe verse by J. Lydgate, Thomas Marshe, London, 1555, folio. Lydgate's work had already appeared in print under the title of The hystory, sege, and dystruccyen of Troy (1513). Braham prefixes a preface of very high interest. He criticises adversely Caxton's uncritical Recueil des Histoires de Troye; speaks in high praise of William Thynne, who had recovered the works of Chaucer; and desired to emulate Thynne's example with respect to Lydgate. Braham condemns severely the carelessness of the printers of the first edition of Lydgate's Troy, and charges them with a fatal ignorance of English. Braham's edition is a well-printed blackletter folio.
