= Falling Over You =

Single by The Triffids

from the album The Black Swan
- B-side: "Can't Help Falling in Love"
- Released: September 1989
- Recorded: September–October, 1988
- Label: White Label; Island
- Songwriter(s): David McComb
- Producer(s): Stephen Street

The Triffids singles chronology
"Goodbye Little Boy" (1989)	"Falling Over You" (1989)

"Falling Over You" was the second single, released in September 1989, by Australian rock group The Triffids from their album The Black Swan (April 1989). It was produced by Stephen Street (The Smiths, Morrissey) and co-written by David McComb and Adam Peters. The tracks were recorded between September and October 1988 at The Justice Room, Cathanger, Somerset and mixed at Fallout Shelter, London, November 1988. "You Minus Me" was written and produced by McComb. The single appeared as a 7", 12" and cassette single version.

== Track listing ==
1. "Falling Over You"
2. "Can't Help Falling in Love"
3. "You Minus Me" (12")

== Personnel ==
=== The Triffids ===
- David McComb – vocals
- Robert McComb
- Graham Lee – classic guitar
- Alsy MacDonald
- Martyn Casey
- Jill Birt

=== Additional musicians ===
- Adam Peters – programming
- Philip Kakulas
- Rita Menendez
