= Edmund Braham =

Pianist, composer, and publisher active in the United States after 1895

Edmund Braham (October 8, 1860 – November 1, 1921) was a pianist, composer, and publisher active in the United States after 1895.

== Biography ==
Born Edmund Phineas Abrahams in London to upper-class parents Israel and Phoebe Abrahams, Edmund changed his surname sometime before 1895, when he moved permanently to the United States. He was reputed to have toured widely before then, beginning as a child virtuoso. From 1895 to 1897 he was based in New York, then moved to Minneapolis, returning to New York City in 1900. He lived there until 1915, although he continued touring; then he moved to Grand Forks, North Dakota, managing the sheet music department of O. Young's music store. A year later he settled in Chicago, where he was active as a publisher, first with Frances-Clifford and then, in 1921, establishing his own firm.

Braham married and raised two children in England, coming to America after his wife died. About 1897 he married Nellie (Lily) Hargerty of Wisconsin, with whom he had six more children; his family moved to Minneapolis when he left Grand Forks, and his wife opened a cafe. Braham's death was sudden and unexpected, after a brief bout of pneumonia.

== Music ==
"Do Your Little 'Bitty-Bit' (Right Now!)"
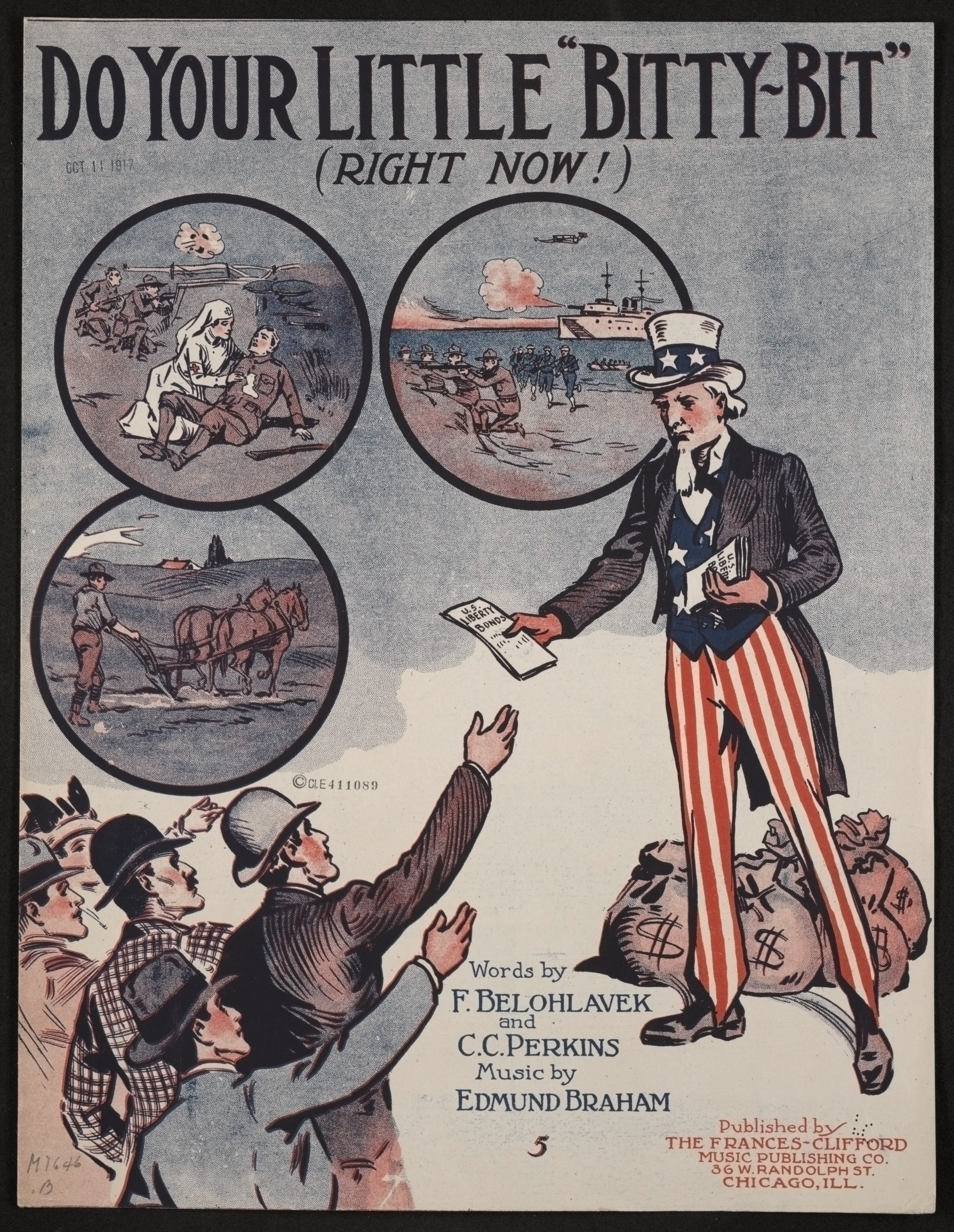
- Cover to 1917 sheet music.

Song
- Language: English
- Written: 1917
- Published: 1917
- Composer(s): Edmund Braham
- Lyricist(s): F. Belohlavek, C. C. Perkins

As a concert performer Braham specialized in improvisation, building entire concerts from themes suggested by the audience. His creative facility carried over to composition; he numbered his pieces, and ten months before his death he had reached op. 480. Most were incidental piano pieces—marches, waltzes, two-steps—and a fair number appeared on piano rolls, some of which Braham himself recorded. In arrangements for band or orchestra many works had a second life; “The Avenger,” a march, was recorded by Arthur Pryor’s band, for example. Two songs from 1917 were especially successful, receiving multiple recordings: the 1917 Liberty Loan campaign song “Do Your Little ‘Bitty-Bit’ (Right Now!),” and a ballad, “To You, Dear, To You.” The esteem in which Braham was held by the profession is evidenced by a formal and sympathetic obituary printed in The Billboard.

== Further reading and digital resources ==
- “Edmund Braham,” The Billboard (November 12, 1921), p. 103.
- James Taylor Dunn, “A Century of Song: Popular Music in Minnesota,” Minnesota History 44:4 (Winter, 1974), pp. 122–141.
- IN Harmony: Sheet Music from Indiana
- James Edward Myers World War I Sheet Music Collection
- World War I Sheet Music from the James Francis Driscoll Collection of American Sheet Music
