= Alsy MacDonald =

Australian musician and lawyer (born 1961)

- Also known as: Alsy MacDonald
- Born: Alan Roger MacDonald; 14 August 1961 (age 64); Perth, Western Australia, Australia
- Genres: Rock
- Occupations: Musician, drummer, singer
- Instrument: Drums
- Years active: 1976–1989

Alan MacDonald (born 14 August 1961) is an Australian musician and lawyer, best known as the drummer of the 1980s band the Triffids, where he performed under his nickname 'Alsy'.

He was born on 14 August 1961 to Bill MacDonald, a professor of child health at University of Western Australia, and Judy Henzell (AM), a well-known paediatrician. He was the youngest of the four children, with two older brothers and a sister. As a child he could not say 'Alan' properly so called himself 'Alsy'. He went to Hollywood Senior High School in Perth, Western Australia and was close friends with David McComb.

In 1976, partly in response to the emergence of punk rock, MacDonald and McComb formed Dalsy, later known as Blök Music and then The Triffids (from the post-apocalyptic John Wyndham novel, The Day of the Triffids). McComb and MacDonald wrote and performed songs with Phil Kakulas (later in Blackeyed Susans), Andrew McGowan, Julian Douglas-Smith, and later Byron Sinclair, Will Akers and Margaret Gillard. By Christmas 1978, they had released several home-recorded cassette tapes and been through many line-up changes.

In 1981, The Triffids released their first, 7-inch vinyl single, "Stand Up", as a result of winning a song competition run by the Western Australian Institute of Technology. Subsequent releases included the Reverie EP, "Spanish Blue", and the Bad Timing and Other Stories EP. They moved to Sydney, in 1982. The band's first 12-inch vinyl album, Treeless Plain, was released in 1983. The band's line-up stabilised to David McComb (vocals, guitar), his brother Robert McComb (guitar, violin), Jill Birt (keyboards), Alsy MacDonald (drums), Martyn P. Casey (bass).

In August 1984, the band flew to London, where they recorded the critically acclaimed album, Born Sandy Devotional, they toured Europe and returned to Western Australia in 1986 to record In The Pines on the McComb's family property in Ravensthorpe, south east of Perth. The Triffids line-up was finalised with the addition of 'Evil' Graham Lee on pedal steel and guitar. Lee having recorded the mini-album, Lawson Square Infirmary with the band members in 1984.

In 1987, the band signed a three-record deal with Island Records, which saw the release of Calenture and The Black Swan. In 1989 tired from the constant travelling and touring, the band dissolved. MacDonald played with The Blackeyed Susans between 1989 and 1990 and upgraded his high school qualifications. He enrolled in law at Murdoch University in 1992.

MacDonald married Jill Birt, the keyboardist for the band. They have three children. Jill is a practising architect who graduated from the University of Western Australia.

After graduating with his law degree in 1995, MacDonald applied for a short-term contract at the Equal Opportunity Commission in Perth and is currently the commission's senior legal advisor.
