= Heinz-Wolfgang Schnaufer =

German fighter pilot (1922–1950)

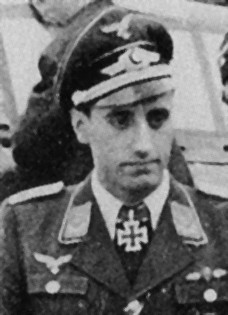
- Born: 16 February 1922; Calw, Württemberg, Weimar Germany
- Died: 15 July 1950 (aged 28); Bordeaux, France
- Burial place: Calw, Village Cemetery
- Military career
- Allegiance: Nazi Germany
- Branch: Luftwaffe
- Service years: 1939–1945
- Rank: Major (major)
- Nickname: Spook of Sint-Truiden
- Units: NJG 1, NJG 4
- Commands: 12./NJG 1, IV./NJG 1, NJG 4
- Conflicts: World War II; Operation Cerberus; Defence of the Reich; Battle of the Ruhr; Battle of Berlin
- Awards: Knight's Cross of the Iron Cross with Oak Leaves, Swords and Diamonds
- Other work: Wine business

Heinz-Wolfgang Schnaufer (16 February 1922 – 15 July 1950) was a German Luftwaffe night-fighter pilot and the highest-scoring night fighter ace in the history of aerial warfare. A flying ace is a military aviator credited with shooting down five or more enemy aircraft during combat. All Schnaufer's 121 victories were claimed during World War II, mostly against British four-engine bombers, (Note: For a list of Luftwaffe night fighter aces see List of German World War II night fighter aces) for which he was awarded the Knight's Cross of the Iron Cross with Oak Leaves, Swords and Diamonds, Germany's highest military decoration at the time, on 16 October 1944. (Note: In 1944, the Knight's Cross of the Iron Cross with Oak Leaves, Swords and Diamonds was second only to the Grand Cross of the Iron Cross, which was awarded only to senior commanders for winning a major battle or campaign, in the military order of the Third Reich. The Knight's Cross of the Iron Cross with Oak Leaves, Swords and Diamonds as the highest military order was surpassed on 29 December 1944 by the Knight's Cross of the Iron Cross with Golden Oak Leaves, Swords and Diamonds.) He was nicknamed "The Spook of St. Trond", from the location of his unit's base in occupied Belgium.

Born in Calw, Schnaufer grew up in the Weimar Republic and Nazi Germany. Already a glider pilot at school, he began military service in the Wehrmacht by joining the Luftwaffe in 1939. After training at various pilot and fighter-pilot schools, he was posted to Nachtjagdgeschwader 1 (NJG 1—1st Night Fighter Wing), operating on the Western Front, in November 1941. He flew his first combat sorties in support of Operation Cerberus, the breakout of the German ships Scharnhorst, Gneisenau, and Prinz Eugen from Brest. Schnaufer participated in the Defence of the Reich campaign from 1942 onwards, in which he would achieve most of his success. He claimed his first aerial victory on the night of 1/2 June 1942. As the war progressed, he accumulated further victories and later became a squadron leader and group commander. He was awarded the Knight's Cross of the Iron Cross on 31 December 1943 for reaching 42 aerial victories.

Schnaufer achieved his 100th aerial victory on 9 October 1944 and was awarded the Diamonds to his Knight's Cross of the Iron Cross with Oak Leaves and Swords on 16 October. He was appointed Geschwaderkommodore (wing commander) of Nachtjagdgeschwader 4 (NJG 4) on 4 November. By the end of hostilities, Schnaufer's night-fighter crew held the unique distinction that every member—radio operator and air gunner—was decorated with the Knight's Cross of the Iron Cross. Schnaufer was taken prisoner of war by British forces in May 1945. After his release a year later, he returned to his home town and took over the family wine business. He sustained injuries in a road accident on 13 July 1950 during a wine-purchasing visit to France, and died in a Bordeaux hospital two days later.

== Early life ==
Heinz-Wolfgang Schnaufer was born on 16 February 1922 in Calw, located in the Free People's State of Württemberg of the German Reich, during the Weimar Republic era. He was the first of four children of mechanical engineer and merchant Alfred Schnaufer and his wife Martha, née Frey. The other three children were his brother Manfred, his sister Waltraut and his brother Eckart. (Note: Waltraut married Schnaufer's adjutant, Oberleutnant Georg Fengler, on 15 April 1950.) His father owned and operated the family business, the winery Schnaufer-Schlossbergkellerei (lit. "Schnaufer's Castle Mountain Winery"), in the Lederstraße, Calw.

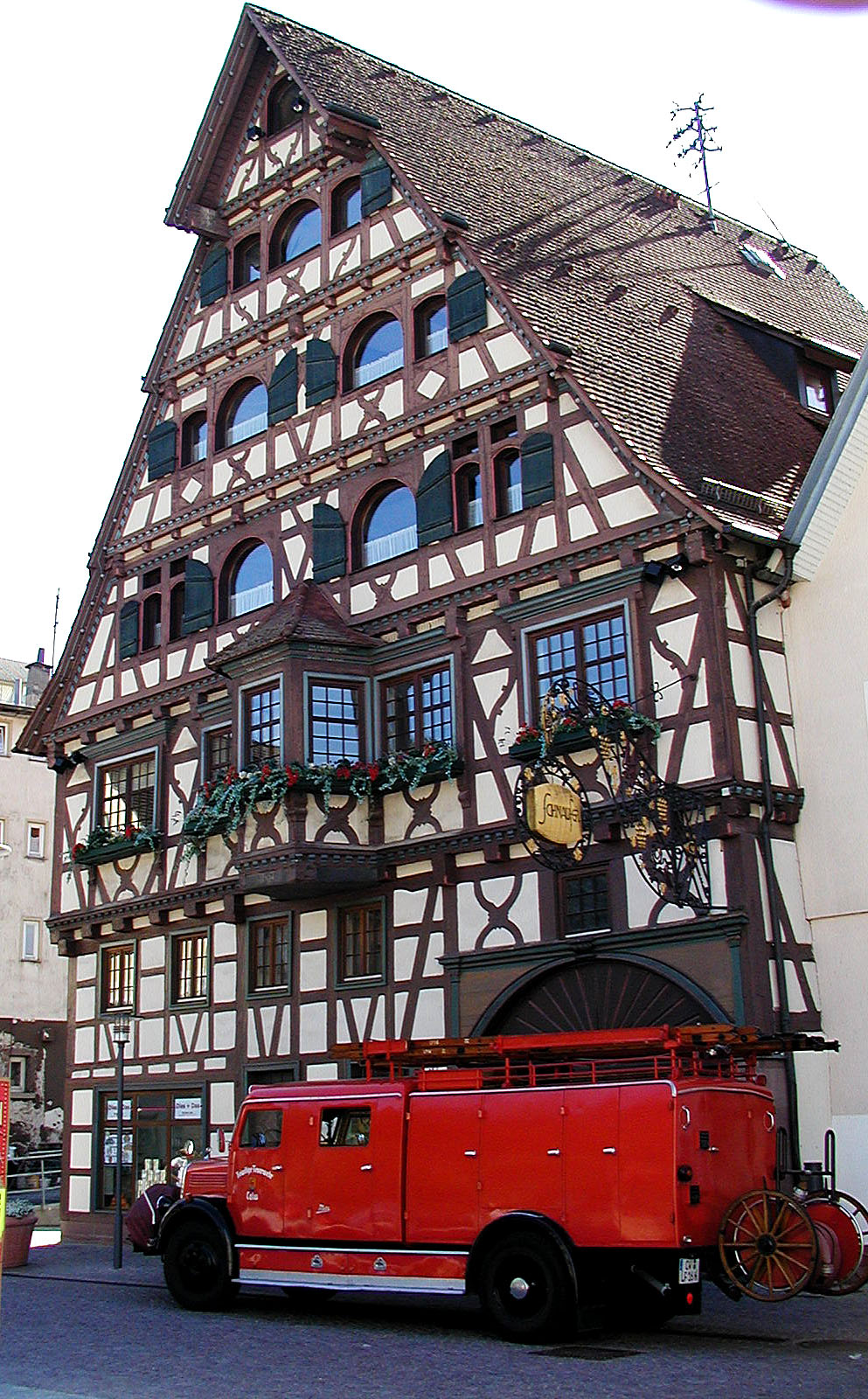
House Schnaufer Home of the Schlossbergkellerei

The winery had been founded by both his father and his grandfather, Hermann Schnaufer, in 1919, shortly after World War I. Following the death of his grandfather in 1928 the winery was run by his father alone. When his father unexpectedly died in 1940, his mother ran the business until the children took over the winery after World War II. The company then expanded the business and in addition to the winery offered wine imports, sparkling wines, and a distillery for wine and liqueur. The distribution channel worked with agents and sales offices throughout Germany.

Schnaufer, at the age of six, went to the local Volksschule (primary school) at Calw. After completing his fourth grade, he received two years of schooling at the Oberschule, also in Calw. At an early age he expressed his wish to join an organisation of military character and joined the Deutsches Jungvolk (junior section of Hitler Youth) in 1933. After completing his sixth grade at school he took and passed the entry examination at the Backnang National Political Institutes of Education (Nationalpolitische Erziehungsanstalt—Napola), a secondary boarding school founded under the recently established Nazi state. The goal of the Napola schools was to raise a new generation for the political, military and administrative leadership of the Third Reich. Schnaufer was considered a very good student, finishing top of his class every year. Aged seventeen he graduated with his Abitur (diploma) in November 1939 with distinction. At the Napola school he also received the Reich Youth Sports Badge (Reichsjugendsportabzeichen), the base-certificate of the German Life Saving Association (Deutsche Lebens-Rettungs-Gesellschaft), the bronze Hitler Youth-Performance Badge (HJ-Leistungsabzeichen), and completed his B-license to fly glider aircraft. In 1939 Schnaufer was one of two students posted to the Napola in Potsdam. The Flying Platoon (Fliegerzug) stationed in Potsdam centralised all the destined flyers from all the Napolas. Here he learned to fly glider aircraft, at first short hops on the DFS SG 38 Schulgleiter, and later on the two-seater Göppingen Gö 4 which was towed by a Klemm Kl 25. During his stay at Potsdam, the film producer Karl Ritter was making the Ufa film Cadets in Potsdam. The Napola had detached two companies to work on the film, among them Schnaufer. It remains unclear exactly what role he played in this film.

Following his graduation from school, Schnaufer passed his entry exams for officer cadets of the Luftwaffe. He joined the Luftwaffe on 15 November 1939 and underwent his basic military training at the Fliegerausbildungs-Regiment 42 (42nd Flight Training Regiment) at Salzwedel. Schnaufer was appointed as Fahnenjunker (cadet) on 1 April 1940. He then received his flight training at the Flugzeugführerschule A/B 3 (FFS A/B 3—flight school for the pilot license) at Guben, now the Cottbus-Drewitz Airport. (Note: Flight training in the Luftwaffe progressed through the levels A1, A2 and B1, B2, referred to as A/B flight training. A training included theoretical and practical training in aerobatics, navigation, long-distance flights and dead-stick landings. The B courses included high-altitude flights, instrument flights, night landings and training to handle the aircraft in difficult situations. For pilots destined to fly multi-engine aircraft, the training was completed with the Luftwaffe Advanced Pilot's Certificate (Erweiterter Luftwaffen-Flugzeugführerschein), also known as the C-Certificate.) He completed his A/B flight training on 20 August 1940. He was trained to fly the Focke-Wulf Fw 44, Fw 56 and Fw 58, and the Heinkel He 72, HD 41 and He 51, the Bücker Bü 131, the Klemm Kl 35, the Arado Ar 66 and Ar 96, the Gotha Go 145 and the Junkers W 34 and A 35.

Schnaufer then attended the advanced Flugzeugführerschule C 3 (FFS C 3—advanced flight school) at Alt Lönnewitz near Torgau and the blind flying school Blindflugschule 2 (BFS 2—2nd blind flying school) at Neuburg an der Donau from August 1940 to May 1941. This qualified him to fly multi-engine aircraft. During this assignment he was promoted to Fähnrich (cadet sergeant) on 1 September 1940, to Oberfähnrich (rank equivalent to Company Sergeant Major) on 1 February 1941 and to the officer rank of Leutnant (second lieutenant) on 1 April 1941. He was then posted for ten weeks to the Zerstörerschule (destroyer school) at Wunstorf near Hanover. At Wunstorf, Schnaufer and the radio operator (Bordfunker) Friedrich Rumpelhardt were assigned as an aircrew team on 3 July 1941. Schnaufer's previous radio operator had proved unable to cope with aerobatics, and Schnaufer thoroughly tested Rumpelhardt's ability to cope with aerobatics before they teamed up. Here the two decided to volunteer to fly night fighters to defend against the increasing Royal Air Force (RAF) Bomber Command offensive against Germany. Following their training at Wunstorf, the two were sent to the Nachtjagdschule 1 (1st night fighter school) at Schleißheim near Munich, formerly the Zerstörerschule 1 (ZS 1—1st destroyer school), to learn the rudiments of night-fighting. The night fighter training was carried out on the Ar 96, the Fw 58 and the Messerschmitt Bf 110. Training at night focused on night takeoffs and landings, cooperation with searchlights, radio-beacon direction finding and cross country flights.

== World War II ==
A map of part of the Kammhuber Line. The 'belt' and night fighter 'boxes' are shown.

In November 1941, Schnaufer was posted to the II. Gruppe of Nachtjagdgeschwader 1 (II./NJG 1—2nd group of the 1st Night Fighter Wing) at the time based at Stade near Hamburg. (Note: For an explanation of the meaning of Luftwaffe unit designation see Organisation of the Luftwaffe during World War II.) Here, Schnaufer was assigned to the 5. Staffel (5./NJG 1—5th squadron of 1st Night Fighter Wing). The Bf 110's of II./NJG 1 at the time were not equipped with airborne radar such as the Lichtenstein radar. Night fighter intercept tactics had matured since their early beginnings in July 1940, and II. Gruppe had already been credited with 397 victories. Missions against enemy bombers at the time were usually flown by means of ground-controlled interception, although the Luftwaffe was already experimenting with airborne radar. This air defence system, consisting of a series of radar stations with overlapping coverage, layered three deep, was conceived by Generalleutnant (lit. Lieutenant General; equivalent to Major General) Josef Kammhuber and was organised in the so-called Kammhuber Line. Conceptually, the system was based on a combination of ground-based radar stations, search lights and a Jägerleitoffizier (fighter pilot control officer). The Jägerleitoffizier had to vector the airborne night fighter by means of radio communication to a point of visual interception of the illuminated bomber. These interception tactics were referred to as the Himmelbett (canopy bed) procedure.

On 15 January 1942, II./NJG 1 transferred to Sint-Truiden—Saint-Trond in the French pronunciation—in Belgium. Schnaufer entered front-line service at a time when the RAF was reassessing the air offensive against Germany. The effectiveness of British Bomber Command to accurately hit German targets had been questioned by the War Cabinet Secretary David Bensusan-Butt who published the Butt Report in August 1941. The report in parts concluded that the British crews failed to navigate to, identify, and bomb their targets. Although the report was not widely accepted by senior RAF commanders, Prime Minister Winston Churchill, instructed Commander-in-Chief Richard Peirse that during the winter months only limited operations were to be conducted. Flight operations were also hindered by bad weather in the first months of 1942, so II./NJG 1 only saw very limited action during that period.

=== Channel Dash and night fighter pilot ===
On 8 February 1942, II. Gruppe was transferred to Koksijde Air Base without having scored any victories while stationed at Sint-Truiden. The objective of this assignment was to give the German battleships Scharnhorst and Gneisenau and the heavy cruiser Prinz Eugen fighter protection in the breakout from Brest to Germany. The Channel Dash operation (11–13 February 1942) by the Kriegsmarine (Navy) was codenamed Operation Cerberus by the Germans. In support of this, the Luftwaffe under the leadership of General der Jagdflieger (General of the Fighter Force) Adolf Galland, formulated an air superiority plan dubbed Operation Donnerkeil for the protection of the three German capital ships. II./NJG 1 was briefed of these plans in the early morning hours on 12 February. The plan called for protection of the German ships at all costs. The crews were told that if they ran out of ammunition they must ram the enemy aircraft. To the relief of the night fighters they were assigned to the first-line reserves. The operation, which took the British by surprise, was successful and the night fighters were kept in their reserve role. On the evening of 12 February, II./NJG 1 was relocated to Amsterdam Airport Schiphol. On the afternoon of 13 February, Schnaufer flew a reconnaissance mission over the IJsselmeer and the North Sea and then relocated to Westerland on the island of Sylt. They then relocated again to Aalborg-West in Denmark from where they made a low-level flight in close formation over the Skaggerak, landing at Stavanger-Sola. Over the following days they operated from the airfield at Forus, making a short-term landing at Bergen-Herdla. In total, Schnaufer made two operational flights without contact with the enemy. Following this assignment they relocated to 5. Staffel's new base in Germany at Bonn-Hangelar via Oslo-Gardermoen, Aalborg, and Lüneburg.

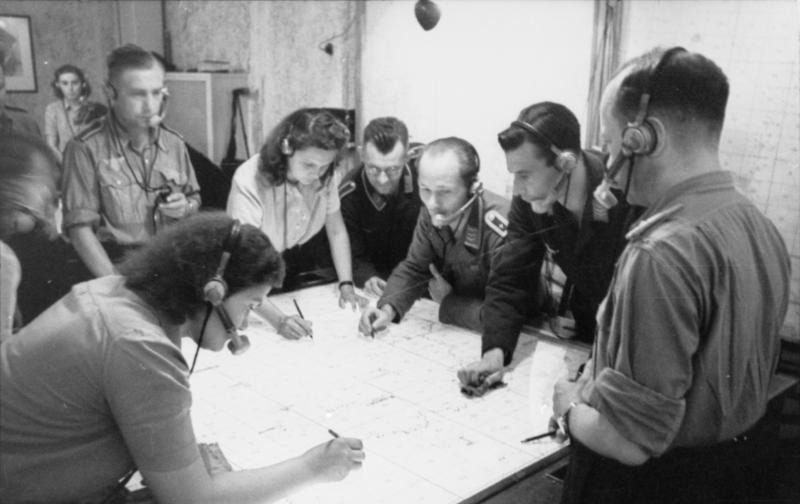
Radio control center for night fighters, Jägerleitoffiziere and assistants plotting courses and directing the airborne fighters.

Following the analysis of the Butt Report, the British High Command made a number of decisions in February 1942 that changed the nature of the bomber war against Germany. On 14 February, Air Chief Marshal Norman Bottomley issued the "Area Bombing Directive", which lifted the restrictions placed on the bombers in 1941. Air Chief Marshal Arthur Harris, commonly known as "Bomber" Harris, was appointed commander-in-chief of Bomber Command. These decisions, coupled with the introduction of Gee, a radio navigation system which enabled better target-finding and bombing accuracy, led to the first Allied 1,000 bomber raid. In Operation Millennium, the RAF targeted and bombed Cologne on the night of 30/31 May 1942. Schnaufer did not participate in the missions in defence of Cologne. The Himmelbett procedure had limitations in the number of aircraft which can be controlled. Therefore, only the most experienced crews were deployed, and Rumpelhardt and Schnaufer, who had yet to achieve their first aerial victory, were left out. Prior to Operation Millennium, Schnaufer had been appointed Technischer Offizier (TO—Technical Officer) on 10 April 1942 and was located at Sint-Truiden again. As a Technical Officer, Schnaufer was responsible for the supervision of all technical aspects such as routine maintenance, servicing and modifications of the Gruppe. In this role he was no longer a member of the 5. Staffel but was then a member of the Stab (staff) of II./NJG 1.

Schnaufer claimed his first aerial victory on their thirteenth combat mission flown one day after the attack on Cologne on the night 1/2 June 1942. Nominally this was the RAF's second 1,000 bomber raid against Germany, although the attacking force actually numbered 956 aircraft. Schnaufer shot down a Handley Page Halifax south of Louvain in Belgium. The aircraft probably was Halifax W1064 from No. 76 Squadron piloted by Sergeant Thomas Robert Augustus West, which was shot down at 01:55 on 2 June 1942 and crashed at Grez-Doiceau, 15 kilometres (9.3 mi) south of Louvain. West and another member of the crew were killed. This victory was achieved by ground-controlled interception through the Kammhuber Line. Once near to the target, Rumpelhardt had visually found the bomber and directed Schnaufer into attack position from below and astern. The Halifax caught on fire after two firing passes. During this mission the Himmelbett flight officer vectored them to a second bomber, a Bristol Blenheim. The attack had to be aborted after Hauptmann (Captain) Walter Ehle shot down the bomber from a more favourable attack position. Shortly before 03:00, they were then flying in the vicinity of Ghent, they spotted another target. Schnaufer made two unsuccessful attacks. During their third attack, which closed the distance to 20 metres (66 ft), they were hit by the defensive gunfire. Schnaufer was hit in his left calf, the port engine was burning, the rudder control cables were severed, and an electrical short circuit caused the landing lights to be permanently on. Rumpelhardt and Schnaufer considered bailing out but decided to make an attempt for their home airfield after they managed to put out the flames and restart the engine. While Rumpelhardt made radio contact with the Sint-Truiden airbase, Schnaufer landed the aircraft without rudder control and on ailerons and engine-power alone. This was the only time that their aircraft sustained damage in combat or any member of the crew was wounded. Both Rumpelhardt and Schnaufer were awarded the Iron Cross 2nd Class (Eisernes Kreuz 2. Klasse) for their first aerial victory. Schnaufer had hoped that he could stay on active duty and that the bullet lodged in his calf would isolate itself. However, he had to be admitted to a hospital in Brussels from 8–25 June for surgery. Rumpelhardt was given home leave until 26 June while Schnaufer was in the hospital.

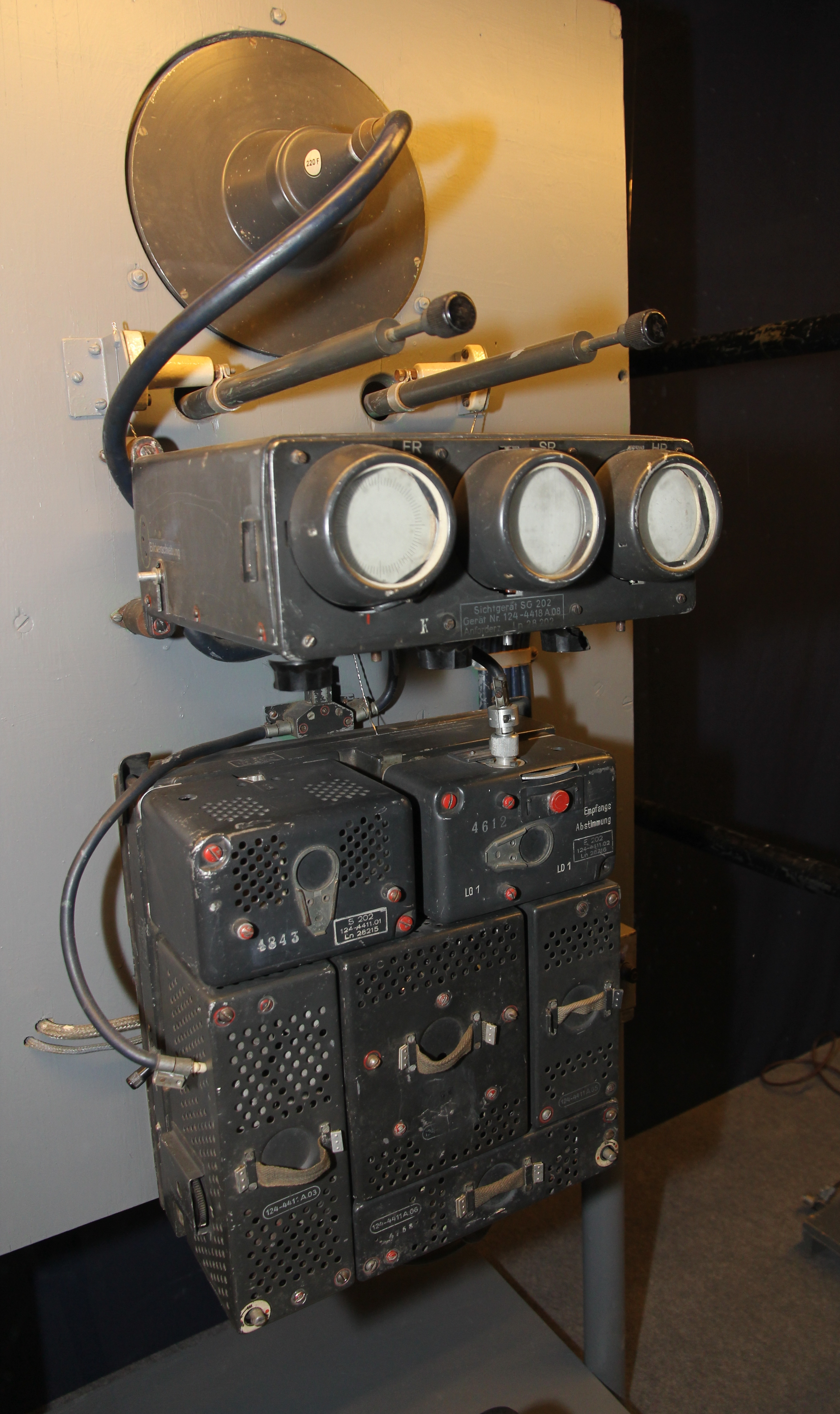
Lichtenstein cathode-ray tubes: • The left tube indicated other aircraft ahead as bumps. • The centre tube indicated range to a specific target and whether they were higher or lower. • The right tube indicated whether the target was to left or right.

Schnaufer had to wait two months to achieve another victory, claiming the destruction of two Vickers Wellingtons and one Armstrong Whitworth Whitley within the space of 62 minutes in the early hours of 1 August. The first Wellington, originally identified by the crew as a Halifax, was severely damaged 3,000 metres (9,800 ft) above the Netherlands and forced to crash land, killing the air gunner at 2:47 hours. The second Wellington was shot down 3,800 metres (12,500 ft) over Brussels, killing everyone on board at 3:17 hours. Rumpelhardt and Schnaufer flew their first combat mission with the Lichtenstein radar on the night 5/6 August 1942. Though they managed to make contact with an enemy aircraft they failed to shoot it down. On the night of the 24/25 August 1942, Schnaufer became an ace (his fifth aerial victory), when he filed a claim for another Wellington, probably BJ651, which was shot down with the loss of Sergeant Eric Bound and crew. This was the first time Rumpelhardt had guided him into contact using the FuG 202 Lichtenstein B/C UHF-band airborne radar. His next claim was made on the night of 28/29 August. This was probably No. 78 Squadron Halifax II W7809, piloted by Sergeant John A. B. Marshall of the Royal Australian Air Force, on a secondary attack against Saarbrücken. All crew died in the crash. The primary attack force was targeting Nuremberg that night. On the night of the 21/22 December 1942, Schnaufer shot down Avro Lancaster R5914; his first victory against this type. The aircraft crashed at Poelcapelle, killing three on board. It was Schnaufer's seventh victory. Schnaufer may also have been responsible for the destruction of another Lancaster that night. Rumpelhardt and Schnaufer had attacked a Lancaster and observed it catching fire followed by the aircraft plunging earthwards. Hauptmann Wilhelm Herget from I./Nachtjagdgeschwader 4 (I./NJG 4—1st group of the 4th Night Fighter Wing) had also attacked a four-engined bomber in the same vicinity. The draw decided in favour of Herget who was given credit for the destruction of the Lancaster, which was probably W4234. The aircraft had been shot down over Belgium, killing all on board save the rear gunner.

=== Rumpelhardt is absent ===
By the end of 1942, Schnaufer's total stood at seven, with three victories recorded on the night of 1 August, which had earned him the Iron Cross 1st Class (Eisernes Kreuz 1. Klasse) in early September 1942. From 29 November to 16 December 1942, Rumpelhardt was confined to the hospital bed with high fever. Rumpelhardt then attended various officer training courses from February to October 1943. Between 14 May to 3 October 1943, Schnaufer claimed 21 further aerial victories in Rumpelhardt's absence; 12 with Leutnant Dr. Leo Baro, five with Oberfeldwebel Erich Handke, two with Oberleutnant Freymann and two with Unteroffizier Heinz Bärwolf as his radio operators. Unteroffizier Heinz Wenning had also flown with Schnaufer on three flights while Rumpelhardt was out ill.

II./NJG 1 saw little action in the first few months of 1943, and Schnaufer did not claim his next aerial victory until 14 May 1943. II./NJG 1 Himmelbett control areas were located to catch the bombers heading for the Ruhr Area. Bomber Command had made only ten major attacks in that region from January to April 1943. Consequently, II./NJG 1 claimed no victories in January, two in February, one in March and three in April. Schnaufer's number of aerial victories increased again during the Battle of the Ruhr. Schnaufer, with Baro as his radio operator, shot down a No. 214 Squadron Short Stirling R9242 at 02:14 on 14 May 1943 on an attack mission against Bochum. Four members of the crew, including pilot Sergeant Raymond Gibbney, lost their lives. His next victory on the same mission at 03:07, his 9th overall, was a No. 98 Squadron Halifax JB873 returning from Bochum. The captain, Sergeant G. Dane and co-pilot Sergeant J. H. Body were killed in the crash. On the night of 29/30 May, Bomber Command attacked Wuppertal. Schnaufer and Baro took off on the first wave at 23:51 on 29 May and returned at 02:31 on 30 May. They shot down two Stirlings, one at 00:48 and the other at 02:22, and one Halifax at 01:43. The first Stirling, BF565, was shot down near Kettenis, killing all on board. The Halifax was shot down over Duras, killing everybody save one on board. The second Stirling was shot down over Schaffen Airfield, with all aboard losing their lives.

In June 1943, Schnaufer filed claims for a further five aerial victories. Schnaufer and Baro were scrambled on 11/12 June in Bomber Command's attack on Düsseldorf, and on 16/17 June in defence of Cologne. However, in both missions they failed to make contact with the enemy. Their next success came when they shot down a Stirling from No. 218 Squadron on 22 June 1943 at 01:33. With Baro on the radio and radar, they managed another victory over a Wellington on 25 June 1943 at 02:58. On 29 June 1943, the two shot down three bombers in another attack on Cologne, a Lancaster and two Halifax bombers at 01:25, 01:45 and 01:55 respectively. This brought the number of aerial victories he was credited with up to seventeen. Schnaufer was promoted to Oberleutnant (first lieutenant) on 1 July 1943. He had been eligible for this promotion since April 1943; why he was overlooked at the time remains unknown.

Schnaufer claimed his last two aerial victories with Baro operating the radio on the night of 3/4 July, Bomber Command had again targeted Cologne. Their victims were a No. 196 Squadron Wellington shot down at 00:48 and a No. 149 Squadron Stirling at 02:33, bringing his total to 19 victories. His next radio operator was Oberleutnant Freymann, the signals operator of II. Gruppe. Under Himmelbett control they shot down a No. 49 Squadron Lancaster, on another Cologne bombing mission, on 9 July 1943 at 02:33. He was awarded the Honour Goblet of the Luftwaffe (Ehrenpokal der Luftwaffe) on 26 July 1943.

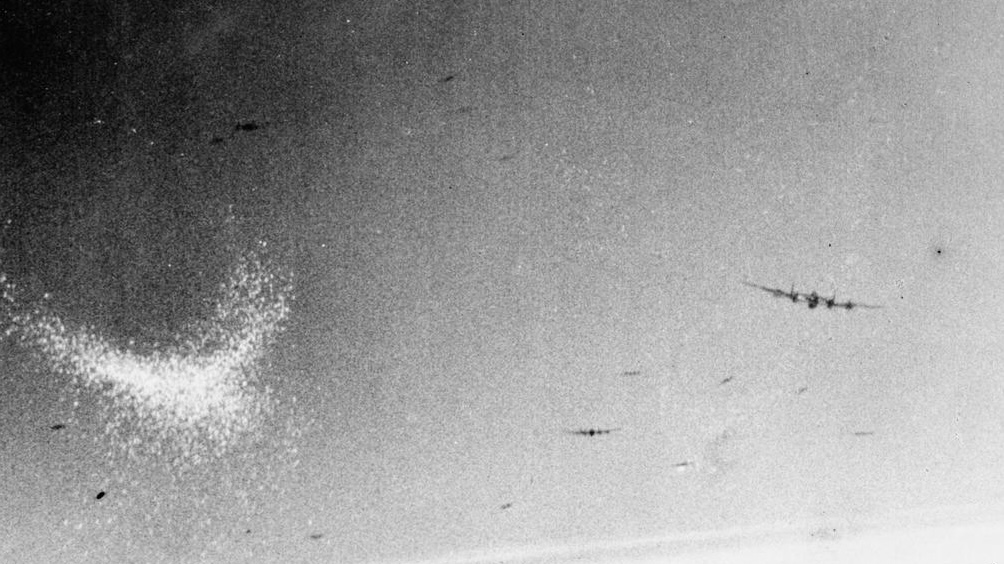
A Lancaster dropping Window

In mid-July, the Battle of the Ruhr was coming to an end and Bomber Command refocused its efforts on the port city of Hamburg in northern Germany. The codename for the attack was Operation Gomorrah; the objective was the destruction of Hamburg. The operations began on 24 July 1943 and during four major night-attacks by the RAF and two minor day-attacks by United States Army Air Forces (USAAF) between 40,000 and 50,000 civilians were killed. To counter the mounting success of the German night fighter force, which was directly attributed to the introduction of the Lichtenstein radar, the RAF introduced Window (Chaff or Düppel to the Germans). Window was a radar countermeasure in which aircraft spread a cloud of small, thin pieces of aluminium which effectively made it impossible for the German radar operator to identify the genuine target. Saturation of the Himmelbett control areas by a bomber stream and the introduction of Window practically made the previous Himmelbett procedure obsolete. This was also evident to the German high command. To counter these British measures two new strategies were pursued, Wilde Sau (Wild Boar) and Zahme Sau (Tame Boar). Wilde Sau, conceived by Hans-Joachim Herrmann, was a technique by which the RAF bombers were mainly engaged by single-seat fighter planes, illuminated by searchlights, over the target area. The Zahme Sau procedure, proposed by Viktor von Loßberg, called for a night fighter to infiltrate the bomber stream. The position, altitude, and general direction was then broadcast. The information was received by other night fighters, who navigated to the bomber stream by themselves. In Zahme Sau, the German night fighters were tracked and radio-controlled by means of Y-Verfahren (Y-Control). Schnaufer did not make any claims during Operation Gomorrah. Their next success came when he and Freymann shot down a Lancaster on 10/11 August 1943 at 00:32. The target that night was Nuremberg and it was the first aerial victory of the entire German night fighter force achieved by Y-Control. This was also the last victory with Freymann and his last as a member of II. Gruppe.

=== Squadron leader of 12.Staffel/NJG 1 ===
Schnaufer was transferred to IV Gruppe of NJG 1 (IV./NJG 1—4th group of the 1st Night Fighter Wing), based in the Netherlands at Leeuwarden Air Base, where he was appointed Staffelkapitän (squadron leader) of the 12. Staffel (12./NJG 1—12th squadron of 1st Night Fighter Wing) on 13 August 1943. He took over command from Oberleutnant Eberhard Gardiewski, who had been taken prisoner of war. (Note: Gardiewski was shot down in combat with a USAAF B-17 Flying Fortress over the North Sea on a daylight mission and was rescued by an RAF air-sea rescue vessel.) At the time, IV./NJG 1 was under the leadership of Gruppenkommandeur (Group Commander) Hauptmann Hans-Joachim Jabs. Jabs' first impression of Schnaufer was not entirely favourable. Shortly after Schnaufer's arrival, on one of his first missions in Leeuwarden, Schnaufer had taken right of way during taxiing. This forced Jabs into second place in order of takeoff, an act of insubordination and perceived as arrogant by Jabs.

Schnaufer, who had received the German Cross in Gold (Deutsches Kreuz in Gold) on 16 August 1943, flew his first operational mission with 12./NJG 1 on the night of 17/18 August 1943. Although uncertain, it is assumed that Handke was Schnaufer's radio and radar operator on this mission. Bomber Command had targeted Peenemünde and the V-weapons test centre that night. Schnaufer, who had been tasked with leading one of the first Zahme Sau missions under Y-Control, had to abort the mission early due to engine trouble. (Note: Five Bristol Beaufighter night fighters of No. 141 Squadron, under the command of Wing Commander Bob Braham, intercepted the German flight, and Feldwebel Georg Kraft and Feldwebel Heinz Vinke were both shot down by Braham. Kraft's radio operator Unteroffizier Rudi Dunger and Vinke were the only ones to survive.)

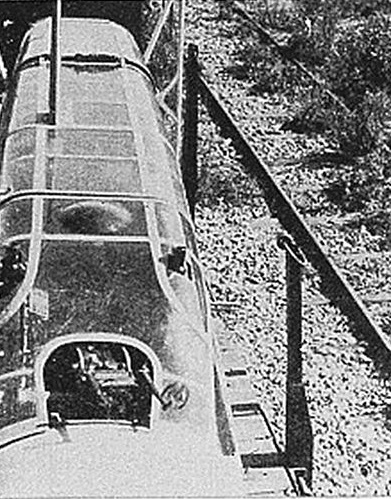
Rear view of a Bf 110G's rear cockpit glazing with MG FF/M Schräge Musik.

Around mid-September 1943, the two-man Bf 110 crew was augmented by a third member, sometimes referred to as Bordmechaniker (air mechanic) or Bordschütze (air gunner). The reason for this was that the decline of the Himmelbett procedure, the introduction of the broadcast procedure Zahme Sau, and the growing threat of RAF intruder night fighter operations, had necessitated the need for another pair of watchful eyes to the rear. Unteroffizier Wilhelm Gänsler, who had already contributed to 17 claims made by Hauptmann Ludwig Becker, was Schnaufer's new lookout. With Handtke and Gänsler as his crew, Schnaufer claimed his 26th aerial victory on 23 September 1943 over a No. 218 Squadron Stirling during a Wilde Sau intercept mission.

Following its May 1943 debut in action, during the second half of 1943, Schnaufer and his crew began experimenting with upward-firing autocannons, dubbed Schräge Musik. This allowed the night fighter to approach and attack the bombers from below—outside the enemy crew's usual field of view. An attack by a Schräge Musik-equipped night fighter typically came as a complete surprise to the bomber crew, who realised a night fighter was close by only when they came under fire. It is not exactly known when Schnaufer's Bf 110 was equipped with Schräge Musik. Rumpelhardt stated that the weapons system was installed prior to his return from officer training. It is also not exactly known how many of his victories had been claimed using the upwards firing cannons. According to Fritz Engau, who had known Schnaufer since Flugzeugführerschule C 3, 20 to 30 of Schnaufer's aerial victories had been claimed using upwards firing guns.

Rumpelhardt had returned from his officer training courses in early October 1943 and rejoined Schnaufer's crew. Gänsler, Rumpelhardt and Schnaufer claimed aerial victories 29 and 30 on 9 October. Oberleutnant Schnaufer was awarded the Knight's Cross of the Iron Cross (Ritterkreuz des Eisernen Kreuzes) for 42 victories on 31 December 1943. The presentation was made by Generalmajor (lit. Major General; equivalent to Brigadier) Joseph Schmid, commanding general of the I. Jagdkorps (1st Fighter Corps), on 3 January 1944.

On the night before his 22nd birthday, on 15 February 1944, Schnaufer and his crew claimed aerial victories 45 to 47. Bomber Command had sent 561 Lancasters and 314 Halifax four-engined bombers, supported by de Havilland Mosquito night-fighters and bombers, destined for Berlin. Schnaufer, who had been suffering from stomach pains all day, and his crew returned to Leeuwarden at 00:14. Rumpelhardt had been the first to congratulate him on his birthday over the intercom. Their fellow airmen had prepared a birthday celebration. The stomach pains had become unbearable and Schnaufer was taken to a hospital with appendicitis. He stayed in the hospital for about two weeks before, together with Rumpelhardt, he went on vacation back home. Carelessly lifting his suitcase, he burst his stitches, resulting in further hospitalisation. He flew his first mission after these events on 19 March 1944.

=== Group commander of the IV./NJG 1 ===
Schnaufer was appointed Gruppenkommandeur IV./NJG 1 on 1 March 1944, taking over command of the Gruppe from Jabs who was given command of NJG 1. He was promoted to Hauptmann on 1 May 1944. Schnaufer became an ace-in-a-day for the first time on 25 May 1944 when he claimed five RAF bombers shot down between 01:15 and 01:29 for victories 70 to 74. The bombers had targeted the railway marshalling yard at Aachen.

On 6 June 1944, the Western Allied forces landed in Normandy, during Operation Overlord. In support of the invasion of Normandy General Dwight D. Eisenhower, the Supreme Allied Commander, assigned Bomber Command to support the ground forces. On the night of 12/13 June, Schnaufer claimed his first victory following the invasion when 671 bombers attacked various railway targets in France. Schnaufer claimed three bombers shot down that night, the first as a Lancaster and the second and third as a Lancaster or Halifax, between 00:27 and 00:34.

Hauptmann Schnaufer was awarded the Knight's Cross of the Iron Cross with Oak Leaves (Ritterkreuz des Eisernen Kreuzes mit Eichenlaub) on 24 June following four aerial victories claimed on 22 June, which took his total to 84 victories. For Schnaufer, July 1944 was less successful than the previous three months. He claimed two bombers on the night of 20/21 July and three on 28/29 July, taking his total to 89 aerial victories. One day later, on 30 July, he received a letter from Göring telling him that he had been awarded the Knight's Cross of the Iron Cross with Oak Leaves and Swords (Ritterkreuz des Eisernen Kreuzes mit Eichenlaub und Schwertern). Hitler himself made the presentation. It is said that when he came to the presentation his first words were, "Where is the night fighter?" Shortly following the presentation of the Schwerter both Rumpelhardt and Gänsler received the Knight's Cross of the Iron Cross on 8 August. His crew was the only night fighter crew in the entire Luftwaffe of which all crew members wore this decoration.

In early September 1944, NJG 1 was forced to abandon its airfields in the Netherlands and Belgium. Continuous heavy attacks by RAF and USAAF bombers and strafing by Allied fighter-bombers rendered the airfields unsuitable for operations. On 2 September, VI./NJG 1 relocated from Sint-Truiden to Dortmund-Brackel. Schnaufer achieved his 100th victory on 9 October 1944, when he claimed two bombers shot down from an attack force of 415 bombers targeting Bochum. He was mentioned in the Wehrmachtbericht on 10 October 1944 and awarded the Knight's Cross of the Iron Cross with Oak Leaves, Swords and Diamonds (Ritterkreuz des Eisernen Kreuzes mit Eichenlaub, Schwertern und Brillanten) on 16 October 1944. He was the 94th Luftwaffe pilot to achieve the century mark.

=== Wing commander of Nachtjagdgeschwader 4 ===
Schnaufer was then appointed Geschwaderkommodore (wing commander) of Nachtjagdgeschwader 4 (NJG 4—4th Night Fighter Wing) on 20 November 1944; the youngest Geschwaderkommodore in the Luftwaffe at the age of 22. The Geschwaderstab and the II. Gruppe were stationed at Gütersloh. He flew his first combat mission as Geschwaderkommodore on 22 November 1944 from Gütersloh and claimed two victories in the area of Dortmund. Schnaufer and his crew flew from Gütersloh to Berlin-Staaken on 27 November 1944 for the official presentation of the Diamonds to the Knight's Cross of the Iron Cross with Oak Leaves and Swords by Hitler. Following the official photo session by Hitler's photographer Heinrich Hoffmann, Schnaufer met with Oberst (Colonel) Nicolaus von Below, Hitler's Luftwaffe adjutant, at the Reichsluftfahrtministerium (Ministry of Aviation). Here Schnaufer and his crew were filmed for the German newsreels Die Deutsche Wochenschau. Three days later they returned to Gütersloh.

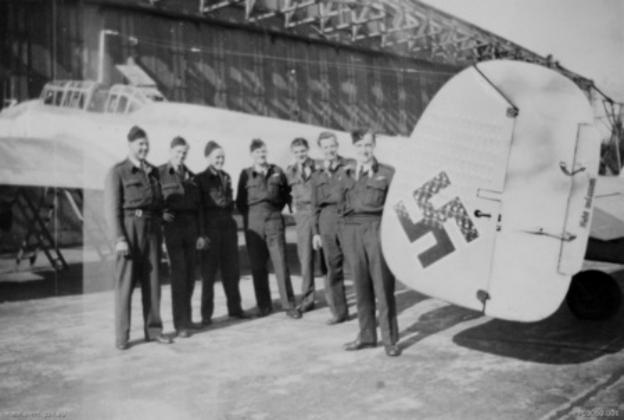
Members of the Royal Australian Air Force pose with Schnaufer's Bf 110G-4 (C3+BA, Stab/NJG 1) at Schleswig, Germany, shortly after the end of the war (19 June 1945)

Schnaufer became the leading night fighter pilot on 9 November 1944. Schnaufer surpassed Oberst Helmut Lent's record of 102 night-time victories, after he claimed three Lancasters shot down from a force of 235 Lancasters from No 5. Group which attacked the Dortmund-Ems Canal. Schnaufer, whose victory total stood at 106 at the end of 1944, failed to shoot down a single bomber in January 1945. It was his first month without filing a claim since April 1943.

Schnaufer was ordered to Carinhall, the residence of the Reichsmarschall Hermann Göring, on 8 February 1945. Göring informed him about the intent to appoint him as Inspekteur der Nachtjäger (Inspector of the night fighter force), a role held by Oberst Werner Streib at the time. Schnaufer pushed back, not wanting to push out his friend and mentor from this position. He argued that he would better serve the German cause fighting the enemy. Göring was convinced and Schnaufer remained in his position as Geschwaderkommodore.

The British propaganda radio station Soldatensender Calais (Soldiers' Radio Calais) congratulated Schnaufer on account of his 23rd birthday on 16 February 1945. The radio station explicitly addressed the soldiers of NJG 4 stationed in Gütersloh followed by the song "Das Nachtgespenst" [The Bogeyman] praising him for the honorary title given to him by the British bomber crews "The spook of St. Trond".

Schnaufer's greatest one-night success and the second time he became an ace-in-a-day was on 21 February 1945, when he claimed nine Lancaster heavy bombers in the course of one day. Two were claimed in the early hours of the morning and a further seven, in just 19 minutes, in the evening between 20:44 and 21:03. Schnaufer was one of the influential figures that instigated a brief return to mass intruder operations over England named Operation Gisela. General der Nachtjagd (General of Night Fighters), was Generalleutnant Schmid, commanding I. Jagdkorps and Kammhuber, commanding XII. Fliegerkorps, and de facto command-in-chief of the German Night Fighter Force until November 1943, had long since desired to return to intruder operations over Bomber Command bases in England. The proposals met resistance from Hans-Jürgen Stumpff, Chief of the General Staff. Eventually, in October 1944, Schmid won support from Streib, Inspekteur der Nachtjagd, to begin planning an operation. Schnaufer voiced his support also. In his experience, he had regularly pursued RAF bombers to the English coast, or least the other side of the frontline. In British airspace, and over territory the Germans did not control, he experienced a lack of radar interference. Schnaufer recalled that he could fly around as if it was peace time, since all British jamming and interference stopped immediately once he was in Allied airspace.

Schnaufer flew this Dornier Do 335 in April 1945.

On 7/8 March, he claimed three RAF four-engine bombers for victories 119 to 121. These were his last victories of the war. He was then banned from further combat flying and was given the task of evaluating the then new Dornier Do 335, a twin-engine heavy fighter with a unique "push-pull" layout, for its suitability as night fighter. Disobeying his ban from combat flying, he flew his last mission of the war on 9 April 1945. Attempting to chase a Lancaster, he took off from Faßberg Air Base at 22:00 and landed after 79 minutes at 23:19 without success.

== Prisoner of war ==
Schnaufer was taken prisoner of war by the British Army in Schleswig-Holstein in May 1945. According to Schumann, he was taken to England for interrogation. In this account British authorities were especially interested in knowing whether his achievements had been made under the influence of methamphetamine or other stimulating psychoactive drugs which induce temporary improvements in either mental or physical functions or both, as had been documented in widespread Wehrmacht use and made for the German military by the Temmler-Werke GmbH firm, under the name Pervitin. Schnaufer was released later that year in November following a bout of diphtheria.

According to Hinchliffe, this is an incorrect statement. Hinchliffe based his account on Rumpelhardt's testimony who claims that Schnaufer was never taken to England. Rumpelhardt was released on 4 August 1945 and soon after Schnaufer was admitted to a hospital in Flensburg, ill with a combination of diphtheria and scarlet fever. Interrogation had begun in late May 1945 by a team of twelve officers from the Department of Air Technical Intelligence (DAT), led by Air Commodore Roderick Aeneas Chisholm. The German prisoners were brought to Eggebek. Here they conducted a number of interviews with various members of the night fighter force.

== Later life and death ==
Following his release from the hospital and as a prisoner of war—the exact date is unknown—Schnaufer took over the family wine business. He had never planned to run the family winery; his ambition had always been to pursue an officer's career in the Luftwaffe. However, in the immediate aftermath of World War II the business had virtually ceased to exist and Schnaufer was given the task of rebuilding it from scratch. He had to re-establish business links to suppliers and customers and to consolidate them. Then he had to make new contacts in order to facilitate expansion and growth of the business. Lastly, he had to create an infrastructure which supported the growth of the business.

"Quality before Quantity."

— Heinz Schnaufer's business motto

As the wine business began to prosper, Schnaufer also gave thought to alternative employment possibilities in peacetime aviation. With his wartime friend Hermann Greiner, he traveled from Weil am Rhein to Bern in Switzerland to meet South American diplomats; the two hoped to find employment as pilots in South America. To get to Bern, they crossed the Swiss-German border illegally. The meeting was a failure. As they attempted to make a second illegal border crossing to return to Germany they were caught by Swiss border guards. The Swiss handed them over to the French occupation authorities and they were imprisoned in Lörrach, where they remained until Schnaufer managed to make contact with a French general, who was a customer of the Schnaufer winery and had them released. This misadventure kept him away from his business for about half a year.

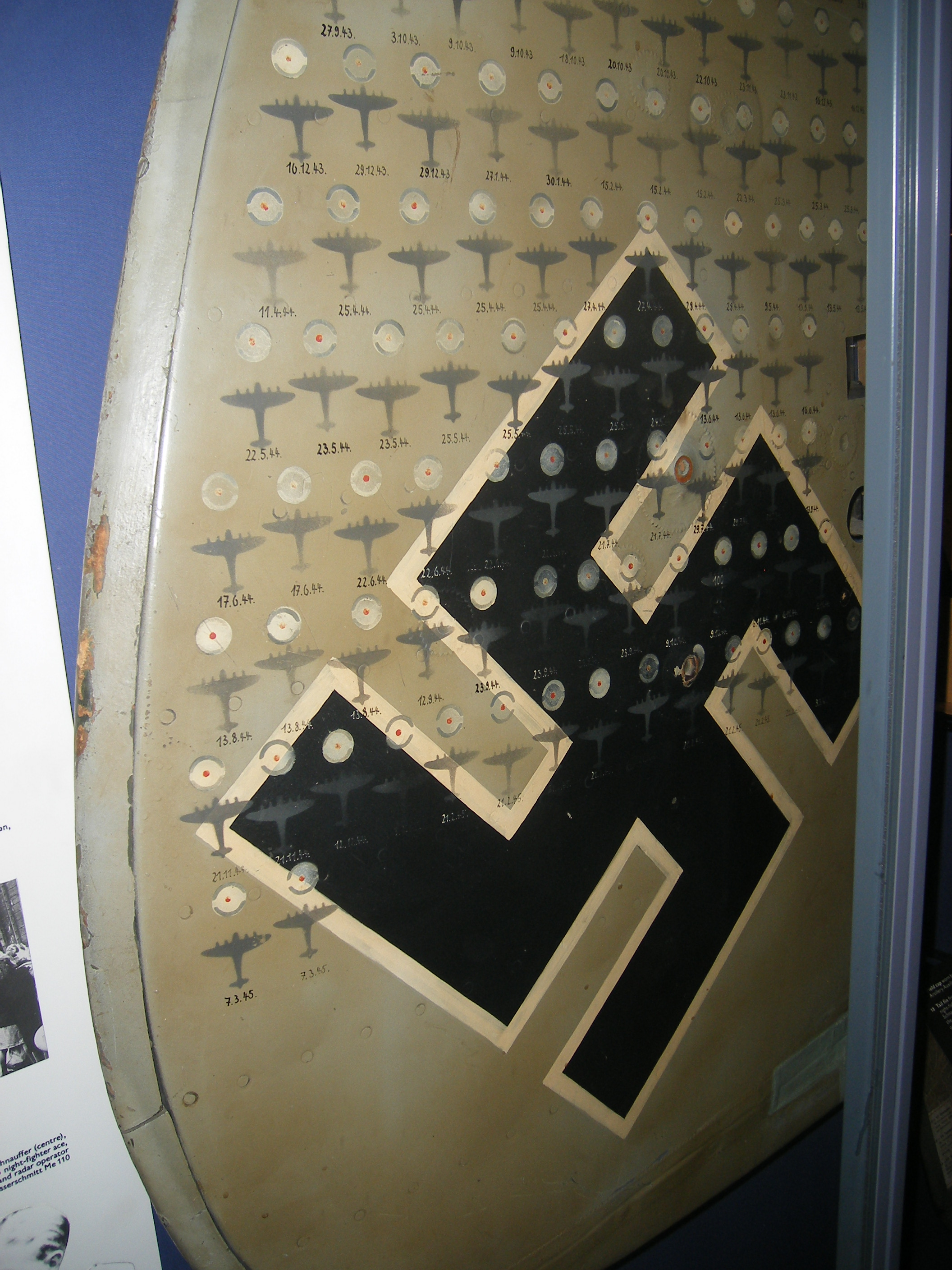
One of the tail fins of Heinz-Wolfgang Schnaufer's Bf 110. It displays all of his 121 victories, Imperial War Museum (2010)

In July 1950, Schnaufer was on a wine buying visit to France. On the afternoon of 13 July, he was heading south on the Route Nationale No. 10 in his Mercedes-Benz 170 convertible with a registration number "AWW 44-3425". Just south of Bordeaux, at about 18:30, he was involved in a collision with a Renault 22 truck. The accident occurred at the intersection of road D1, present-day D211, and the N10, present-day D1010, in Cestas (44°42′04″N 0°42′20″W). The truck, driven by Jean Antoine Gasc, was carrying 6 tonnes (6.6 short tons) of empty gas cylinders. The collision ruptured the fuel tank of the Mercedes and ignited the petrol. Witnesses to the accident quickly put out the flames. Alice Ducourneau gave first aid to Schnaufer, who was bleeding from a wound from the back of his head. The police appeared at the scene of the accident at about 19:30, followed by an ambulance shortly thereafter. Schnaufer had suffered a fractured skull, and was immediately taken to the Saint-André Hôpital in Bordeaux.

Schnaufer never regained consciousness and succumbed to his injuries at the hospital two days later on 15 July 1950. The investigation into the accident concluded that though the impact of the two vehicles was severe, it seemed unlikely that the collision itself was the cause of his injuries. It was speculated that at least one of the truck's cargo of 30 empty gas cylinders, which were thrown off by the collision, had struck Schnaufer on the head. Subsequently, the truck driver was charged with manslaughter and breach of traffic regulations before a court at Jauge, Cestas. The hearing began on 29 July 1950 and concluded with his conviction on 16 November 1950. Gasc was found guilty of not yielding the right of way, and his speed was considered too high. It was ruled that as a consequence of not observing the law, he involuntarily caused the death of Schnaufer.

Schnaufer's Messerschmitt Bf 110 G-4/U 8 was brought to England after the war. The aircraft was displayed in London's Hyde Park. The port-side vertical stabiliser of this twin tailed aircraft, tallying all his victories, is preserved at the Imperial War Museum in London. A fin from another Bf 110 flown by Schnaufer is at the Australian War Memorial in Canberra. The Calw district Heumaden has a street name "Heinz-Schnaufer-Straße". This street was named after him. In August 1994, a local newspaper published a series about roads named in honor of local personalities, triggering a public debate.

== Summary of career ==
=== Aerial victory claims ===
Schnaufer was the top-scoring night fighter pilot of World War II. He was credited with 121 aerial victories claimed in just 164 combat missions. His victory total includes 114 RAF four-engine bombers; arguably accounting for more RAF casualties than any other Luftwaffe fighter pilot and becoming the third highest Luftwaffe claimant against the Western Allied Air Forces. His flight book indicated 2,300 takeoffs and 1,133 flying hours. Mathews and Foreman, authors of Luftwaffe Aces — Biographies and Victory Claims, researched the German Federal Archives and found documentation for 119 nocturnal aerial victory claims, plus three further unconfirmed claims.

Until late 1944, Schnaufer documented his aerial victories with detailed geographical locations. After this date, he claimed his victories over territory occupied by the Allies, and his victories were logged in a Planquadrat (grid reference), for example "KP-IP". The grid map was composed of rectangles measuring 15 minutes of latitude by 30 minutes of longitude, an area of about 360 square miles (930 km^{2}).

Chronicle of aerial victories
This and the ♠ (Ace of spades) indicates those aerial victories which made Schnaufer an ace-in-a-day, a term which designates a fighter pilot who has shot down five or more airplanes in a single day. This along with the + (plus) indicates almost certain identification. This along with the * (asterisk) indicates probable identification. This along with the ? (question mark) indicates possible identification.
Claim	Date	Time	Type	Location	Unit	Serial No./Squadron No.
– II. Gruppe/Nachtjagdgeschwader 1 –
1	2 June 1942	01:55	Halifax II	Grez-Doiceau, 15 km (9.3 mi) south of Louvain, Belgium	No. 76 Squadron	W1064/MP-J*
2	1 August 1942	02:47	Wellington IC	1 km (0.62 mi) southwest of Loon op Zand, Netherlands	25 Operational Training Unit	DV439/-H*
3	1 August 1942	03:17	Wellington IC	Huldenberg, Belgium	27 Operational Training Unit	DV552/UJ-N+
4	1 August 1942	03:45	Whitley V	Gilly, Charleroi, Belgium	24 Operational Training Unit	BD347*
5	25 August 1942	02:54	Wellington III	Near Loonbeek, Belgium	No. 150 Squadron	BJ651/JN-M*
6	29 August 1942	01:16	Halifax II	Tombeek, 16 km (9.9 mi) southeast of Brussels, Belgium	No. 78 Squadron	W7809/EJ*
7	21 December 1942	23:53	Lancaster I	Poelkapelle, Belgium	No. 106 Squadron	R5914/ZN-+
8	14 May 1943	02:14	Stirling I	Heerlen, Netherlands	No. 214 Squadron	R9242/BU-O*
9	14 May 1943	03:07	Halifax II	Near Blanden, Belgium	No. 78 Squadron	JB873/EY-J+
10	30 May 1943	00:48	Stirling III	South of Baelen, Belgium	No. 218 Squadron	BF565/HA-H+
11	30 May 1943	01:43	Halifax II	Budingen, 7 km (4.3 mi) northwest of Sint-Truiden, Belgium	No. 35 Squadron	DT804/TL-C+
12	30 May 1943	02:22	Stirling III	Schaffen Air Base, 22 km (14 mi) north of Sint-Truiden, Belgium	No. 218 Squadron	BK688/HA-A+
13	22 June 1943	01:33	Stirling III	Langdorp, Belgium	No. 218 Squadron	BK712/HA-D+
14	25 June 1943	02:58	Wellington	Hamme-Mille, south of Louvain, Belgium		
15	29 June 1943	01:25	Lancaster III	Solwaster, southeast of Verviers, Belgium	No. 97 Squadron	LM323/OF-U+
16	29 June 1943	01:45	Halifax V	Wandre, northeast of Liège, Belgium	No. 76 Squadron	DK137/NP-R+
17	29 June 1943	01:55	Halifax II	Near Vottem, north of Liège, Belgium	No. 35 Squadron	HR812/TL-F+
18	4 July 1943	00:48	Wellington X	Averbode, 7 km (4.3 mi) northwest of Diest, Belgium	No. 196 Squadron	HE980ZO-+
19	4 July 1943	01:01	Stirling III	Near Geetbets, 9 km (5.6 mi) northwest of Sint-Truiden, Belgium	No. 149 Squadron	BF530/OJ-B+
20	9 July 1943	02:33	Lancaster III	Near Grobbendonk, 23 km (14 mi) east-southeast of Antwerp, Belgium	No. 49 Squadron	ED663/EA-+
21	11 August 1943	00:32	Lancaster	Hähnlein, 25 km (16 mi) south-southwest of Darmstadt, Germany		
– 12. Staffel/Nachtjagdgeschwader 1 –
22	28 August 1943	03:59	Halifax II	Jemeppe-sur-Sambre, 15 km (9.3 mi) west of Namur, Belgium	No. 102 Squadron	JB835/DY-X+
23	31 August 1943	22:41	Halifax II	2 km (1.2 mi) southeast of Kuinre, Zuider Zee	No. 35 Squadron	HR878/TL-J+
24	31 August 1943	03:53	Wellington X	Near Lozen, north of Bree, Belgium	No. 166 Squadron	HE988/AS-U*
25	24 August 1943	00:09	Halifax II	Near Eschede, 20 km (12 mi) north-northeast of Celle, Germany	No. 77 Squadron	JD379/KN-M*
26	23 September 1943	23:00	Stirling III	5 km (3.1 mi) south of Kirchheimbolanden, Germany	No. 218 Squadron	EJ104/HA-G+
27	27 September 1943	23:31	Halifax	Near Stemmen, west of Stadthagen, Germany		
28	3 October 1943	21:50	Halifax II	Near Lande, 8 km (5.0 mi) north of Minden, Germany	No. 51 Squadron	HR728/LK-D?
29	9 October 1943	01:13	Halifax II	Near Schwaförden, 9 km (5.6 mi) north of Sulingen, Germany	No. 158 Squadron	HR945/NP-Y*
30	9 October 1943	01:42	Four-engined bomber	Near Holtensen, southwest of Hanover, Germany		
31	18 October 1943	20:25	Lancaster III	Near Negenborn, north-northwest of Hanover, Germany	No. 101 Squadron	DV230/SR-T*
32	20 October 1943	19:13	Lancaster III	Near Gieten, east of Assen, Netherlands	No. 7 Squadron	JB175/MG-A+
33	20 October 1943	19:25	Lancaster III	Near Harrenstätte, northwest of Werlte, Germany	No. 405 Squadron	JB348/LQ-R+
34	22 October 1943	21:40	Lancaster III	Near Dransfeld, Hanover, Germany	No. 57 Squadron	JB320/DX-X*
35	23 November 1943	18:50	Lancaster III	2 km (1.2 mi) northwest of Ter Apel, near Emmen, Netherlands	No. 405 Squadron	JA939/LQ-C+
36	23 November 1943	19:00	Lancaster III	Lorup, north-northwest of Cloppenburg, Germany	No. 12 Squadron	JB537/PH-N?
37	16 December 1943	18:01	Lancaster III	Near Follega, Netherlands	No. 7 Squadron	JA853/MG-L+
38	16 December 1943	18:12	Lancaster I	Near Lemmer, Netherlands	No. 101 Squadron	DV300/SR-W+
39	16 December 1943	18:23	Lancaster III	Southwest of Wolvega, Netherlands	No. 49 Squadron	JB545/EA-O+
40	16 December 1943	18:41	Lancaster II	2 km (1.2 mi) southwest of Wirdum, Netherlands	No. 432 Squadron	DS831/QO-N+
41	29 December 1943	18:50	Halifax II	5 km (3.1 mi) northeast of Meppel, Netherlands	No. 10 Squadron	JD314/ZA-X+
42	29 December 1943	19:45	Lancaster II	Near Wietmarschen, west of Lingen, Germany	No. 408 Squadron	DS718/EQ-R+
43 (Note: According to Mathews and Foreman this claim is unconfirmed.)	27 January 1944	19:45	Lancaster III	Near Essen, 4 km (2.5 mi) northwest of Quakenbrück, Germany	No. 12 Squadron	JB283/PH-W?
44	30 January 1944	22:15	Lancaster	In GK5, west of Amsterdam, Houtrakpolder, Netherlands	No. 97 Squadron	JB659/OF-J?
45	15 February 1944	22:58	Lancaster III	In the sea, DJ93	No. 103 Squadron	ND363/PM-A+
46	15 February 1944	23:19	Lancaster II	Near Hoorn, Netherlands	No. 115 Squadron	LL689/KO-P+
47	15 February 1944	23:33	Lancaster I	EL78 in the Wattenmeer, Netherlands	No. 622 Squadron	W4272/GJ-C+
48	22 March 1944	23:10	Lancaster III	Halle, near Lembeck, 18 km (11 mi) south of Brussels, Belgium	No. 9 Squadron	LM430/WS-B+
49	25 March 1944	00:12	Four-engined bomber	East of Dortmund, Germany		
50	25 March 1944	00:21	Lancaster I	Neuwarendorf, east of Münster, Germany	No. 626 Squadron	HK539/UM-A2*
51	25 March 1944	00:41	Four-engined bomber	Near Varsseveld, Netherlands, northeast of Emmerich, Germany		
– IV. Gruppe/Nachtjagdgeschwader 1 –
52	11 April 1944	23:15	Lancaster III	Near Beerse, 6 km (3.7 mi) west of Turnhout, Belgium	No. 83 Squadron	ND389/OL-A+
53	11 April 1944	23:25	Lancaster I	2 km (1.2 mi) north of Sint-Lenaarts, Belgium	No. 49 Squadron	LL899/EA-P+
54	25 April 1944	02:03	Lancaster I	Near Alken, Belgium	No. 115 Squadron	HK542/KO-J*
55	25 April 1944	02:28	Lancaster II	3 km (1.9 mi) north of Mechelen, Belgium	No. 115 Squadron	DS734/KO-Y+
56	25 April 1944	02:30	Halifax III	1 km (0.62 mi) west of Haasdonk, Belgium	No. 192 Squadron	LW622/DT-R*
57	25 April 1944	02:40	Halifax	In the sea at LG 35		
58	27 April 1944	02:05	Lancaster III	1 km (0.62 mi) south of Achtmaal, Netherlands	No. 156 Squadron	JB307/GT-H+
59	27 April 1944	02:18	Lancaster II	Over the sea, LG 38	No. 408 Squadron	DS719/LQ-U*
60	28 April 1944	01:30	Halifax V	8 km (5.0 mi) north of Aubel, Belgium, 15 km (9.3 mi) southwest of Aachen, Germany	No. 434 Squadron	LL258/WL-W+
61	28 April 1944	01:40	Halifax III	Verviers, Belgium	No. 432 Squadron	MZ588/QO-W+
62	9 May 1944	03:34	Halifax III	Near Grand-Reng, 30 km (19 mi) southwest of Charleroi, Belgium	No. 432 Squadron	LW594/QO-G+
63	13 May 1944	00:44	Halifax III	Londerzeel, 8 km (5.0 mi) west of Mechelen, Belgium	No. 426 Squadron	LK883/OW-E*
64	13 May 1944	00:46	Halifax III	5 km (3.1 mi) east-northeast of Hasselt, Belgium	No. 158 Squadron	HX334/NP-C?
65	13 May 1944	00:48	Halifax III	Hoogstraten, 16 km (9.9 mi) northwest of Turnhout, Belgium	No. 466 Squadron	LV919/HD-O+
66	22 May 1944	01:34	Lancaster	3 km (1.9 mi) south of Mol, Belgium		
67	22 May 1944	01:51	Lancaster	10 km (6.2 mi) south of Herentals, Belgium	No. 550 Squadron	DV309/BQ-S+
68	23 May 1944	01:23	Lancaster I	Near Neerpelt, Belgium	No. 75 Squadron	ME690/AA-Z+
69	23 May 1944	01:36	Lancaster I	Near Brecht, 22 km (14 mi) northeast of Antwerp, Belgium	No. 100 Squadron	ME670/HW-Q*
70♠	25 May 1944	01:15	Halifax III	3 km (1.9 mi) northwest of Eindhoven, Netherlands	No. 51 Squadron	LK885/MH-Z+
71♠	25 May 1944	01:18	Halifax III	2 km (1.2 mi) north-northwest of Tilburg, Netherlands	No. 158 Squadron	LW653/NP-T?
72♠	25 May 1944	01:22	Halifax III	1.5 km (0.93 mi) west of Goirle, SSW of Tilburg, Netherlands	No. 76 Squadron	MZ622/MP-L*
73♠	25 May 1944	01:25	Halifax III	Between Dongen and Tilburg, Netherlands	No. 429 Squadron	LW124/AL-N?
74♠	25 May 1944	01:29	Lancaster	7 km (4.3 mi) southwest of Tilburg, Netherlands		
75	13 June 1944	00:27	Lancaster II	Avesnes-les-Auvert, east of Cambrai, France	No. 408 Squadron	DS772/EQ-T+
76	13 June 1944	00:31	Lancaster II	Cambrai airfield	No. 408 Squadron	DS726/EQ-Y*
77	13 June 1944	00:34	Lancaster II	Tilloy, north of Cambrai, France	No. 408 Squadron	DS688/EQ-R+
78	16 June 1944	01:00	Lancaster	North of Arras, France		
79	17 June 1944	01:54	Four-engined bomber	Dreumel, north of s'Hertogenbosch, Netherlands		
80	17 June 1944	02:04	Halifax III	Berkel, Netherlands	No. 77 Squadron	NA524/KN-F+
81	22 June 1944	01:25	Lancaster III	Valkenswaard, Netherlands	No. 44 Squadron	LM582/KM-Q*
82	22 June 1944	01:30	Lancaster I	2 km (1.2 mi) south of Meeuwen, Belgium	No. 207 Squadron	ME683/EM-W*
83	22 June 1944	01:36	Lancaster III	5 km (3.1 mi) south of Opoeteren, Belgium	No. 44 Squadron	LM434/KM-F?
84	22 June 1944	02:05	Lancaster I	6 km (3.7 mi) south of Hamont, Belgium	No. 630 Squadron	ME843/LE-U*
85	21 July 1944	01:40	Lancaster I	1.5 km (0.93 mi) north of Boxtel, Netherlands	No. 90 Squadron	LM183/WP-L?
86	21 July 1944	01:51	Four-engined bomber	8 km (5.0 mi) north of Breda, Netherlands		
87	29 July 1944	01:38	Lancaster I	Pforzheim, Germany	No. 467 Squadron	ME856/PO-T?
88	29 July 1944	01:50	Four-engined bomber	Eutingen, near Pforzheim, Germany		
89	29 July 1944	01:57	Lancaster I	Malmsheim, 20 km (12 mi) west of Stuttgart, Germany	No. 106 Squadron	ME778/ZN-O?
90	13 August 1944	00:48	Four-engined bomber	Wasserliesch, Germany		
91	13 August 1944	01:09	Lancaster III	Werbomont, south-southeast of Liège, Belgium	No. 635 Squadron	ND694/F2-R*
92	13 August 1944	01:15	Four-engined bomber	Gouvy, 28 km (17 mi) south-southwest of Malmedy, Belgium		
93	13 August 1944	01:19	Four-engined bomber	3 km (1.9 mi) west of Mons, near Liège, Belgium		
94	12 September 1944	23:07	Four-engined bomber	RQ-RP		
95	23 September 1944	22:56	Four-engined bomber	JP-HP		
96	23 September 1944	23:10	Four-engined bomber	JO		
97	23 September 1944	23:15	Four-engined bomber	HO-JO		
98	23 September 1944	23:25	Four-engined bomber	JN-HN		
99	9 October 1944	20:32	Four-engined bomber	S of Bochum, Germany		
100	9 October 1944	20:55	Four-engined bomber	JO		
101	6 November 1944	20:55	Four-engined bomber	KP-IP		
102	6 November 1944	19:34	Four-engined bomber	KP-IP		
103	6 November 1944	19:41	Four-engined bomber	KP-IP		
– Stab/Nachtjagdgeschwader 4 –
104	21 November 1944	19:05	Four-engined bomber	KP		
105	21 November 1944	19:11	Four-engined bomber	KP		
106	12 December 1944	20:00	Four-engined bomber	MO-LO		
107	3 February 1945	21:09	Four-engined bomber	LO		
108♠	21 February 1945	01:53	Lancaster	MM-MN		
109♠	21 February 1945	01:58	Lancaster	MM		
110♠	21 February 1945	20:44	Lancaster	HQ-HP		
111♠	21 February 1945	20:48	Lancaster	HP-HO		
112♠	21 February 1945	20:51	Lancaster	HP-HO		
113♠	21 February 1945	20:55	Lancaster	HP-HO		
114♠	21 February 1945	20:58	Lancaster	IO-JN		
115♠	21 February 1945	21:00	Lancaster	JN-KM		
116♠	21 February 1945	21:03	Lancaster	KM-KL		
— (Note: Schnaufer did not claim this aerial victory. His cannon had malfunctioned during the attack and the crew did not observe the result of the attack.)	21 February 1945	21:10	Lancaster I	KM-KL	No. 463 Squadron	NG329/JO-Z*
117	3 March 1945	21:55	Lancaster	HQ		
118	3 March 1945	22:04	Lancaster	HQ		
119	7 March 1945	20:41	Lancaster	LR-MR		
120	7 March 1945	20:47	Lancaster	LS-MS		
121	7 March 1945	21:56	Lancaster	GC-HC		

=== Awards ===
- Front Flying Clasp of the Luftwaffe for Night Fighters in Gold
- Combined Pilots-Observation Badge
- Wound Badge in Black
- Iron Cross (1939)
  - 2nd Class (2 June 1942)
  - 1st Class (19 October 1942)
- Honour Goblet of the Luftwaffe (Ehrenpokal der Luftwaffe) on 26 July 1943 as Leutnant and pilot
- German Cross in Gold on 16 August 1943 as Oberleutnant in the II./Nachtjagdgeschwader 1
- Knight's Cross of the Iron Cross with Oak Leaves, Swords and Diamonds
  - Knight's Cross on 31 December 1943 as Oberleutnant and Staffelführer of 12./Nachtjagdgeschwader 1
  - 507th Oak Leaves on 24 June 1944 as Hauptmann and Gruppenkommandeur of IV./Nachtjagdgeschwader 1
  - 84th Swords on 30 July 1944 as Hauptmann and Gruppenkommandeur of IV./Nachtjagdgeschwader 1 (Note: According to Scherzer on 3 August 1944.)
  - 21st Diamonds on 16 October 1944 as Hauptmann and Gruppenkommandeur of IV./Nachtjagdgeschwader 1

=== Dates of rank ===
1 April 1940:	Fahnenjunker
1 April 1940:	Fahnenjunker-Gefreiter
1 July 1940:	Fahnenjunker-Unteroffizier
1 September 1940:	Fähnrich
1 February 1941:	Oberfähnrich
1 April 1941:	Leutnant (Second Lieutenant)
1 July 1943:	Oberleutnant (First Lieutenant)
1 May 1944:	Hauptmann (Captain)
1 December 1944:	Major (Major)

== Notes ==
Military offices
Preceded by Oberstleutnant Wolfgang Thimmig	Commander of Nachtjagdgeschwader 4; 20 November 1944 – 8 May 1945	Succeeded by none
