= Friedrich Rumpelhardt =

German air officer

Friedrich "Fritz" Rumpelhardt
- Born: 19 June 1920; Nordhalden, Germany
- Died: 20 January 2011 (aged 90); Kehl, Germany
- Military career
- Allegiance: Nazi Germany
- Branch: Luftwaffe
- Service years: 1940–1945
- Rank: Leutnant (second lieutenant)
- Nickname: "Fritz"
- Unit: NJG 1
- Conflicts: World War II: Defense of the Reich
- Awards: Knight's Cross of the Iron Cross

Friedrich "Fritz" Rumpelhardt (19 June 1920 – 20 January 2011) was a German air officer during World War II. He was also a recipient of the Knight's Cross of the Iron Cross, the highest award in the military and paramilitary forces of Nazi Germany during World War II.

During his career Rumpelhardt flew in 130 missions as a Bordfunker (radio/radar operator) with two night fighter wings of the Luftwaffe. He participated in 100 aerial victories as a crewman with Major Heinz-Wolfgang Schnaufer from October 1942 until the end of the war. Rumpelhardt was the most successful radar operator—in terms of aerial victories claimed—in the Luftwaffe night fighter force.

== Early life and career ==
Rumpelhardt was born 19 June 1920 in Nordhalden near Konstanz, at the time in the Republic of Baden of the German Reich during the Weimar Republic. He was one of three sons of the teacher Emil Rumpelhardt and his wife Rosa. Both his twin brothers were killed in action as Luftwaffe pilots during the war. Rumpelhardt attended the Gymnasium, a secondary school, in Singen. In 1938, while still at school, he volunteered for military service in Luftwaffe, requesting to be assigned to the Flak. His application was put on hold. In 1939, he passed his Abitur (university-preparatory high school diploma) and was called into the compulsory Reichsarbeitsdienst (Reich Labour Service).

== World War II ==
World War II in Europe began on Friday 1 September 1939 when German forces invaded Poland. Following the outbreak of war, Rumpelhardt was conscripted into the Wehrmacht, initially serving with a construction company. In February 1940, he transferred to the Luftwaffe, not with a Flak unit as he had initially applied for but with the Nachrichtentruppe (Signal troops). Completing his recruit training at Cottbus in July 1940, Rumpelhardt was then posted to the Bordfunkerschule (radio/radar operator school) at Nordhausen, which lasted seven months. In February 1941, he transferred to the blind flying school Blindflugschule 4 (BFS 4—4th blind flying school) at Vienna-Aspern. There, he was assigned to a pilot who failed the qualifications. In July 1941, he was then posted to the Zerstörerschule (destroyer school) at Wunstorf near Hanover where on 3 July, Rumpelhardt and Heinz-Wolfgang Schnaufer were assigned as an aircrew team. Since Schnaufer's previous radio operator had proved unable to cope with aerobatics, and Schnaufer thoroughly tested Rumpelhardt's ability to cope with aerobatics before they teamed up. Here the two decided to volunteer to fly night fighters to defend against the increasing Royal Air Force (RAF) Bomber Command offensive against Germany.

=== Radar operator with the night fighter force ===
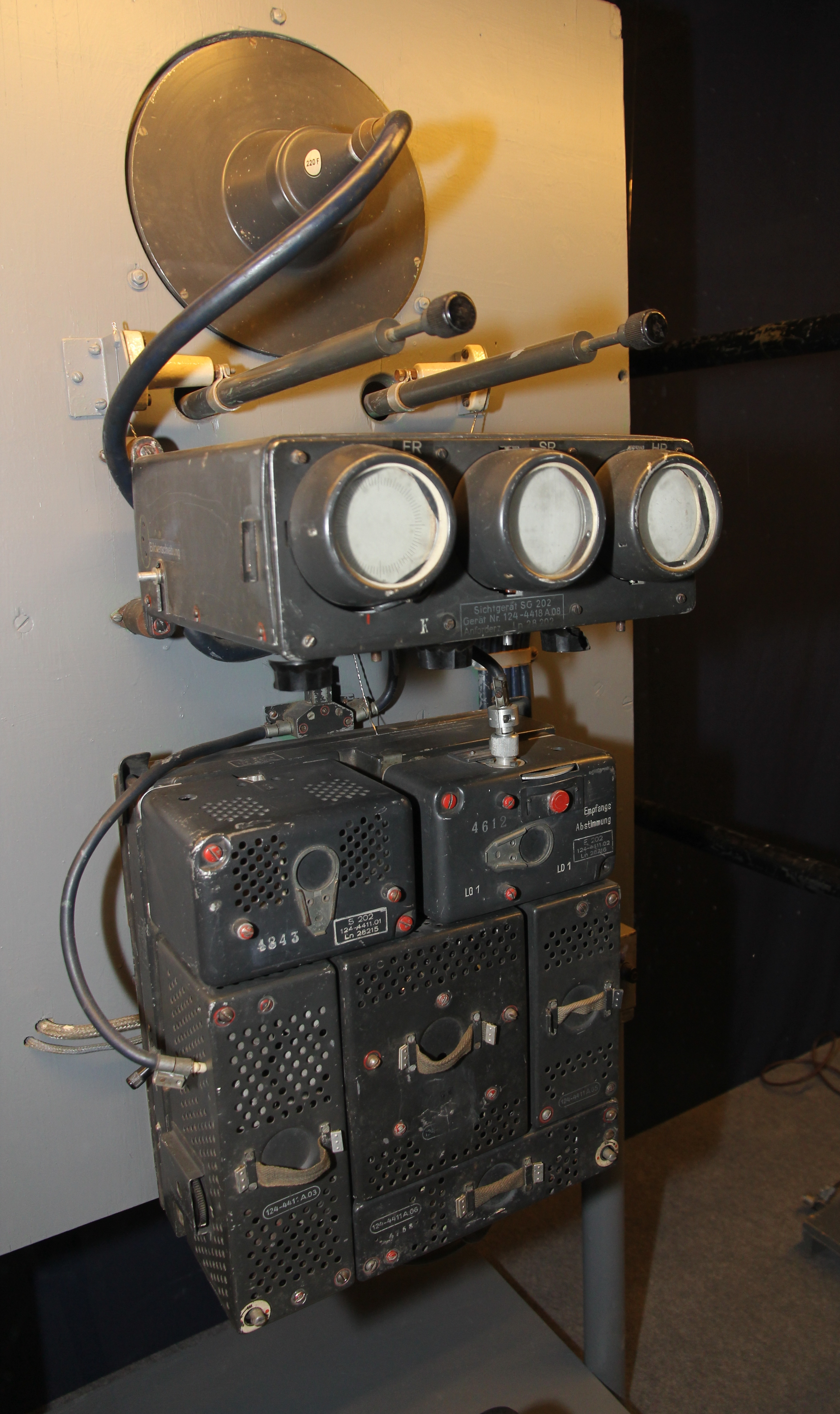
Lichtenstein cathode-ray tubes: • The left tube indicated other aircraft ahead as bumps. • The centre tube indicated range to a specific target and whether they were higher or lower. • The right tube indicated whether the target was to left or right.

On 1 June 1942, Rumpelhardt was promoted to Unteroffizier (corporal). That night, he and Schnaufer claimed their first aerial victory on their thirteenth combat mission flown. Nominally this was the RAF's second 1,000 bomber raid against Germany, although the attacking force actually numbered 956 aircraft. They shot down a Handley Page Halifax south of Louvain in Belgium. The aircraft probably was a Halifax from No. 76 Squadron piloted by Sergeant Thomas Robert Augustus West, which was shot down at 01:55 on 2 June 1942 and crashed at Grez-Doiceau, 15 kilometres (9.3 mi) south of Louvain. West and another member of the crew were killed. This victory was achieved by ground-controlled interception through the Kammhuber Line. Once near to the target, Rumpelhardt had visually found the bomber and directed Schnaufer into attack position from below and astern. Following two firing passes, the Halifax caught on fire. Both Rumpelhardt and Schnaufer were awarded the Iron Cross 2nd Class (Eisernes Kreuz 2. Klasse) for their first aerial victory.

Rumpelhardt and Schnaufer flew their first combat mission with the Lichtenstein radar on the night 5/6 August 1942. Though they managed to make contact with an enemy aircraft they failed to shoot it down. In February 1943, Rumpelhardt was accepted for officer training and for a period of eight months, did not fly any combat missions with Schnaufer. Following an officer selection course, and an assignment as instructor to a junior non-commissioned officer's course (1 May – 15 June 1943), he attended the Kriegsschule (war academy) until 18 September 1943. On 1 October 1943, Rumpelhardt was promoted to Fahnenjunker-Feldwebel (officer cadet). On 1 March 1944, he was made an officer, attaining the rank of Leutnant (second lieutenant). He also served as Nachrichtenoffizier (signals officer) with the Gruppenstab and Geschwaderstab, the headquarters units of the group and the Geschwader.

On 8 August 1944, Rumpelhardt received the Knight's Cross of the Iron Cross (Ritterkreuz des Eisernen Kreuzes) for assisting in 68 nocturnal aerial victories. On 7 March 1945, he reached his 100th nocturnal victory assist. One day later, he was nominated for the Knight's Cross of the Iron Cross with Oak Leaves (Ritterkreuz des Eisernen Kreuzes mit Eichenlaub, this was not approved. Rumpelhardt flew his last combat mission on 9 April 1945. He was the most successful Bordfunker of the Luftwaffe night fighter force.

== Later life ==
Rumpelhardt was taken prisoner of war by the British Army in Schleswig-Holstein in May 1945. There he was interrogated by a team of twelve officers from the Department of Air Technical Intelligence (DAT), led by Air Commodore Roderick Aeneas Chisholm. Rumpelhardt was released on 4 August 1945. He then pursued a career in agriculture. In 1965, Rumpelhardt became head of the agricultural service and the agricultural school of the Hanauerland, headquartered in Kehl. In 1967, he moved to Offenburg, where he directed the agricultural office (Landwirtschaftsamt) until his retirement in 1984.

In the late nineties Rumpelhardt self-published a 119-page account of his wartime experiences, Meine Geschichte und die meiner Familie: Die Zeit des Kriegsdienstes.

Rumpelhard died on 20 January 2011 in Kehl and was buried on 28 January 2011 at the cemetery in Kehl.

== Awards and decorations ==
- Fliegerschützenabzeichen für Bordfunker und Bordschützen (Radio Operator Badge) (5 February 1942)
- Iron Cross (1939)
  - 2nd Class (5 June 1942)
  - 1st Class (1 October 1942)
- Front Flying Clasp of the Luftwaffe
  - in Bronze (31 August 1942)
  - in Silver (18 February 1944)
  - in Gold (4 February 1945)
- German Cross in Gold on 16 April 1944 as Feldwebel in the 12./Nachtjagdgeschwader 1
- Honour Goblet of the Luftwaffe (Ehrenpokal der Luftwaffe) on 17 April 1944 as Feldwebel and Bordfunker (radio operator) (Note: According to Hinchliffe on 20 March 1944.)
- Knight's Cross of the Iron Cross on 27 July 1944 as Oberfeldwebel and Bordfunker in IV./Nachtjagdgeschwader 1 (Note: According to Fellgiebel on 27 July 1944.)

== Publications ==
- Meine Geschichte und die meiner Familie: die Zeit des Kriegsdienstes [My Story and that of my Family: the Time of the War Service] (in German). Neuruppin, Germany: TK. 2002. ISBN 978-3-935317-11-5. OCLC 76411406.
