= Hermann Greiner =

German World War II fighter pilot

- Greiner as a Hauptmann
- Born: 2 January 1920; Heidenheim, Bavaria
- Died: 26 September 2014 (aged 94); Wangen im Allgäu, Germany
- Military career
- Allegiance: Nazi Germany (1938 to 1945); West Germany (1957 to 1972)
- Branch: Luftwaffe; German Air Force
- Service years: 1938–1945, 1957–1972
- Rank: Hauptmann (Wehrmacht); Oberstleutnant (Bundeswehr)
- Unit: NJG 1
- Commands: 10./NJG 1, 11./NJG 1, IV./NJG 1
- Conflicts: World War II: Channel Dash; Defence of the Reich
- Awards: Knight's Cross of the Iron Cross with Oak Leaves

Georg-Hermann Greiner (2 January 1920 – 26 September 2014) was a Luftwaffe night fighter ace who served during World War II. Greiner was recipient of the Knight's Cross of the Iron Cross with Oak Leaves—the fourth highest German award by war's end. He was also a squadron commander in the prestigious Nachtjagdgeschwader 1 (NJG 1—Night Fighter Wing 1), the most successful night fighter interceptor unit of any nation in the history of aerial warfare.

Greiner primarily engaged British RAF Bomber Command crews in their bombing campaigns over German-occupied Europe and was credited with 51 aerial victories over Allied aircraft: four United States Army Air Force (USAAF) bombers during daylight hours and 47 Royal Air Force (RAF) aircraft at night. Only 23 other night fighter pilots—all German World War II serviceman—surpassed Greiner's total which was achieved in three years and six months of operations.

Following the conclusion of the War, Greiner and close friend Heinz-Wolfgang Schnaufer were arrested illegally crossing the German-Swiss border attempting an escape to Argentina. Both Greiner and Schnaufer were detained in an Allied prisoner of war camp and released in 1947. Greiner went on to study law and returned to service in the German Air Force in 1957, retiring with the rank of Oberstleutnant in 1972. (Note: For a list of Luftwaffe night fighter aces see List of German World War II night fighter aces.)

== Early life and career ==
Greiner was born on 2 January 1920 in the small Bavarian town of Heidenheim, Middle Franconia. He was the third child of Albrecht and Sophie Greiner. His father moved away to Bochum, located in the German Ruhr to seek work with Reichsbank, Weimar Germany's central bank. Bochum was under the occupation of the French Army after World War I and there was a distinct lack of affordable housing. The family could not follow and the young Greiner rarely saw his father during his early childhood. When Albrecht had saved sufficient funds he was able to buy a flat in Bochum and he sent for his family. Greiner's father was a strict disciplinarian and the friction caused disharmony in the family. Greiner developed a strong desire to succeed in everything and prove himself worthy of his father's time.

Greiner joined the German Gymnasts Association (Deutscher Turner Bund) at seven and three years later the German Scout Movement (Deutscher Pfadfinder Bund). In 1933 he travelled to Switzerland and Italy with the scout movement at 13. Greiner had the opportunity to stay in Milan and Rome with German families. Greiner was unusually well travelled for a person of his age and social status at that time. In 1936 he was invited to participate at the International Youth Camp for the 1936 Summer Olympics in Berlin. Greiner received invitations to Hungary in 1937, Bulgaria in 1938 and Canada in 1939, but could only visit the Hungarian capital Budapest.

A consequence of the National Socialist rise to power in 1933 was Greiner's enforced membership in the Hitler Youth (Hitlerjugend). After four years in the organisation Greiner took an interest in aviation and joined the Flying Hitler Youth (Flieger Hitlerjugend), which was absorbed into the German Air Sports Association (Deutscher Luftsportscharen), in 1937. Here, Greiner passed the aptitude tests for a career as an officer in the Luftwaffe. All aspiring officers had to complete the Abitur. On 5 April 1938 he achieved the Abitur and then undertook six months of compulsory Reich Labour Service (Reichsarbeitsdienst).

=== Luftwaffe ===
On 8 November 1938 he underwent basic training at the Second Pilot Replacement Unit at Detmold in Westphalia. He completed the course on 20 March 1939. At the conclusion of the course Greiner was rewarded with an acceptance as a Fahnenjunker (officer cadet). He was posted to the Luftkriegsschule 2 (LKS 2—2nd air war school) at Berlin-Gatow to begin flying lessons. There, he learned the rudiments of flying. Greiner flew the Focke-Wulf Fw 44, the Bücker Bü 131 and the Arado Ar 96. On 30 October 1939 he was granted his licence and pilot's badge, and A/B flying certificate, in recognition of his elementary training and qualification on advanced single-engine training aircraft. (Note: Flight training in the Luftwaffe progressed through the levels A1, A2 and B1, B2, referred to as A/B flight training. A training included theoretical and practical training in aerobatics, navigation, long-distance flights and dead-stick landings. The B courses included high-altitude flights, instrument flights, night landings and training to handle the aircraft in difficult situations. For pilots destined to fly multi-engine aircraft, the training was completed with the Luftwaffe Advanced Pilot's Certificate (Erweiterter Luftwaffen-Flugzeugführerschein), also known as the C-Certificate.)

Greiner moved to Saxony where he attended the Flugzeugführerschule C (Aircraft Advanced School C—advanced flying school) in Lönnewitz. At the school Greiner learned to fly the Heinkel He 111 and Junkers Ju 86. At this school he flew the Messerschmitt Bf 110 for the first time. Greiner attended the Long-Range reconnaissance school at Großenhain, followed by the Blindflugschule (Blind Flying School) at Neuburg an der Donau. From here Greiner was posted to the Zerstörerschule (Destroyer School) at Memmingen. Greiner then moved to the Jagdfliegerschule (Fighter School) at Schleißheim, near Munich. Finally, he completed his course at the Nachtjadgschule (Night Fighter School) at Stuttgart to learn the art of night fighting. Greiner flight training ended in September 1941.

== World War II ==
A map of part of the Kammhuber Line. The 'belt' and night fighter 'boxes' are shown.

World War II in Europe began on Friday, 1 September 1939, when German forces invaded Poland. Following the 1939 aerial Battle of the Heligoland Bight, Royal Air Force (RAF) attacks shifted to the cover of darkness, initiating the Defence of the Reich campaign. By mid-1940, Generalmajor (Brigadier General) Josef Kammhuber had established a night air defense system dubbed the Kammhuber Line. It consisted of a series of control sectors equipped with radars and searchlights and an associated night fighter. Each sector named a Himmelbett (canopy bed) would direct the night fighter into visual range with target bombers. In 1941, the Luftwaffe started equipping night fighters with airborne radar such as the Lichtenstein radar. This airborne radar did not come into general use until early 1942.

=== Night fighter career ===
On 1 October 1941, Leutnant Greiner reported for duty with Nachtjagdgeschwader 1 (NJG 1—Night Fighter Wing 1) at Stade near Hamburg. (Note: For an explanation of the meaning of Luftwaffe unit designation see Organisation of the Luftwaffe during World War II.) Greiner was assigned to II. Gruppe (2nd group) under the command of Gruppenkommandeur (group commander) Walter Ehle. Greiner was transferred to 4. Staffel (4th squadron) in mid-January 1942. Along with 6. Staffel it formed the nucleus of II. Gruppe of NJG 1, based at Leeuwarden, Netherlands. In February Greiner participated in Operation Donnerkeil (Thunderbolt), an air superiority mission to provide cover to the German Kriegsmarine (War Navy) and three major warships traversing the English Channel to bases in Germany. The battleships Scharnhorst and Gneisenau and the cruiser Prinz Eugen began the risky operation on 11 February. The naval component was called Operation Cerberus, and succeeded.

On 20 April 1942, Greiner was promoted to Oberleutnant (first lieutenant). In 1942 RAF Bomber Command, under the command of Air Officer Commanding, Arthur Harris, embarked on its long campaign of area bombing against German industrial cities and military targets. On the night of the 25/26 June 1942, 960 aircraft attacked Bremen, targeting the city, shipyards and the Focke-Wulf factory. 472 Vickers Wellington, 124 Handley-Page Halifax, 96 Avro Lancaster, 69 Short Stirling, 51 Bristol Blenheim, 50 Handley-Page Hampden, 50 Armstrong Whitworth Whitley, 24 Boston, 20 Avro Manchester and four de Havilland Mosquito bombers were used. A further 102 Lockheed Hudson and Wellington bombers of RAF Coastal Command were sent on the operation. Greiner was able to intercept a Wellington at daybreak, claiming it shot down south of Harlingen for his first victory at 06:00 with Bordfunker Rolf Kissing. On 6 October 1942, Greiner shot down his second victim west of Harlingen at 23:24. The bomber, a No. 103 Squadron RAF Halifax II, W1189, PM-E, crashed killing all the crew: Sergeants J. Porter, P. B. J. Butcher, R Carson, Pilot Officers R. Whitelock, A. G. Richards, B. C. H. King and Flight Sergeant B. J. Hardesty (RCAF seconded).

Greiner was ordered to report to the Nachtjagdschule at Echterdingen as an instructor. Greiner did not want to serve in a teaching role but as a pilot with only two victories in a year of operations, he had little choice. His Staffelkapitän (squadron leader) Hauptmann (Captain) Helmut Lent promised him a return to the Gruppe after six months. Greiner's stint as instructor began on 23 November 1942. He looked for an opportunity to fly on patrol but the school did not have the required technical equipment. One night in early March 1943, Greiner took off and claimed a Short Stirling shot down near Rastatt. The date and location were not recorded but it was officially granted as his third victory.

On 18 May 1943, Greiner returned to II. Gruppe of NJG 1 which from the 1 October 1942 had been re-designated IV. Gruppe of NJG 1. In March the British applied their area bombing and bomber stream tactics to the Ruhr. The Bomber Command attacks, which lasted until July 1943, were dubbed the Battle of the Ruhr. On the night of the 25/26 May Greiner claimed two Lancaster bombers that were part of a force attacking Düsseldorf. The first was accounted for west of Den Helder at 03:05 and the second north of Bergen aan Zee at 03:25 over North Holland. The claims were for Greiner's fourth and fifth victories which qualified him as a night fighter ace. One of the bombers was Lancaster I ED695, P-OJ, from No. 467 Squadron RAF. Flying Officer R. S. Giddey, Sergeant S. G. Keirs, W. V. Morris, R. V. Avaan, A.F Birkbeck, Pilot Officers K. R. Langhorne and P. R. Collins were reported missing in action. It transpired Langhorne and Birkbeck has been killed in action, the remainder of the crew were taken prisoner of war. On 1 June 1943 Greiner was awarded the Iron Cross 2nd Class (Eisernes Kreuz zweiter Klasse).

Greiner achieved the last of his successes in the Ruhr campaign the following month. On the night of the 5/6 July 1943, he intercepted a Short Stirling on a "Gardening" sortie. Northwest of Leeuwarden he claimed the only night victory of the Luftwaffe at 02:31. The bomber was Short Stirling III, EF436, AA-A, of No. 75 Squadron RNZAF. Sergeant William Edward Stobbs was killed with his crew. Greiner's last victory in the Ruhr campaign came on the 25 July 1943. This night Harris began Operation Gomorrha, a massed air attack on Hamburg. At 02:50 southwest of Den Helder, Greiner claimed a Halifax. This was most likely Lancaster I, ED878, PM-V, of No. 103 Squadron RAF. Warrant Officer F. F. O'Hanlon was killed with his crew when the bomber crashed west of the Frisian Islands.

On the night of the 3/4 August 1943 Greiner claimed his ninth and tenth aerial victories northwest of Schiermonnikoog at 03:06 and 03:48 The first was claimed as a Lancaster, the second as a Wellington. On 24 August Bomber Command mounted an attack on Berlin for the first time using ground-mapping radar. Greiner shot down a Halifax at 01:43 northwest of Berlin. He recorded his 12th victory over a Lancaster near Bergfeine at 23:48 on 22 September. The following night he claimed a Lancaster south of Lampertheim at 23:30. On the night of the 27 September 1943 Greiner intercepted a Halifax over the North Sea. As Greiner approached he saw the bomber was heavily damaged and flying on only two engines just above the waves. Greiner was amazed at the skill of the crew for flying this far. Greiner considered the condition of the bomber and crew, then rocked his wings in salute and flew back to base.

=== Squadron leader ===
On 4 October 1943, Greiner was appointed Staffelkapitän of 10. Staffel of NJG 1. At this time Greiner's Bf 110G-4 was fitted with Schräge Musik, upward firing armament. The arrangement allowed for German night fighters to approach the British bombers in their blind spot, from underneath. The British four-engine bombers lacked a ball turret and the German crew could take their time in aiming more carefully. The night fighter usually flew to the side of the bomber to avoid it being seen by the tail gunner and then slid underneath. The risk in the conventional tactic of approaching from behind and passing within view of the tail turret was eliminated. Greiner was to shoot down the majority of his remaining victims using the Schräge Musik.

Greiner had to wait until Bomber Command flew against Braunschweig on 14/15 January 1944 to use the new armament system. This night the German fighters infiltrated the bomber stream as it crossed the frontier and commenced their attack on the bombers near Bremen. The early interception ensured 11 aircraft were shot down—all Pathfinders. The loss of so many pathfinders prevented the bombers from accurate bombing the city and little damage was done. Near Saint-Dizier at 20:00 intercepted a Lancaster and shot it down. The United States Army Air Force (USAAF) daylight raids were also resisted by the Nachtjagd. On 30 January 1944, Greiner intercepted a B-17 Flying Fortress near Osnabrück. At 13:00 he claimed it shot down. Greiner followed this up with another at the same location at 12:25 on 10 February. It was the only claim filed by a night fighter pilot on this date. Greiner's 17th claim came on 25 February when he claimed a Lancaster over Saint-Dizier at 22:59. Greiner recorded the location as "Beacon Leopold".

Greiner achieved another daylight victory on 6 March 1944. By this time the P-51 Mustang and P-47 Thunderbolt with long-range drop-tanks appeared and it quickly became apparent the zestörer and night fighters could not be committed to day operations without sustaining heavy losses. Greiner's Geschwader was committed to battle nonetheless. The United States Eighth Air Force (US8AF) operated against Berlin on 6 March. Greiner was not scrambled but undertook a flight test to ready his Bf 110G for action. As he took off he observed a B-17 fly over the aerodrome at low-level and gave chase. As he closed he noticed no obvious signs of damage. The B-17 pilot did not alter course or speed. Greiner stayed out of range of the bomber's 13 M2 Browning machine guns and fired. The aircraft—B-17 42-38118 from the 91st Bomb Group—crash-landed. Pilot Second Lieutenant Ben Fourmay was captured but two of his crew were killed. At 13:53 the same day, Greiner accounted for a Consolidated B-24 Liberator over Münsterbrück. Greiner's two day victories were two of the six claims submitted by night fighter crews—four others were credited with a single victory one of which was from Greiner's Geschwader. Eight of the B-24's ten-man crew survived. The bomber, B-24H 42-52306 of 458th Bombardment Group, USAAF flown by Second Lieutenant J. McManus, crash-landed at Münsterlager an Ueltzen. The daylight operation cost the Americans 69 bombers and 11 fighters. The Luftwaffe lost 64 fighters with eight crew killed and 36 missing.

On 19 March 1944, Greiner was awarded the German Cross in Gold (Deutsches Kreuz in Gold) for 15 night and four day victories. Greiner was transferred to command 11. Staffel of NJG 1 on 15 April 1944. In April 1944, IV. Gruppe of NJG 1 moved to Sint-Truiden—Saint-Trond in the French pronunciation—Belgium. The Gruppe was now under the command of Heinz-Wolfgang Schnaufer. He achieved his first success with 11. Staffel on the night of the 22/23 April 1944 Greiner scrambled for a night patrol when Bomber Command struck Düsseldorf. The 596 bombers (323 Lancaster and 254 Halifax) were supported by 19 Mosquito intruders. Northwest of the city, Greiner was vectored onto a Lancaster and claimed it shot down at 01:39. The bomber was Greiner's 20th victory. On 24/25 April Greiner claimed a Halifax near Breda at 02:18. On the night of the 27/28 April Greiner achieved another double victory. This night 322 Lancaster bombers of 1, 3, 6 and 8 Groups bombed Friedrichshafen. Another 223 aircraft (191 Halifax, 16 Lancaster and 16 Mosquito bombers) were despatched to Aulnoye-Aymeries. A third wave of 120 Halifax, 16 Lancaster and eight Mosquito bombers attacked railway yards at Montzen on the Belgian-German border. Greiner intercepted the bomber stream over Belgium. West of Genk at 01:58 he claimed a Lancaster then a Halifax southeast of Oerle two minutes later. The only Lancaster lost this night was JA976, from No. 405 Squadron RCAF. It crashed at Diest. Squadron leader E. W. Blenkinsop DFC, Croix de Guerre, evaded capture and joined with the Belgian Resistance before being captured in December 1944. He died at Neuengamme concentration camp on 23 January 1945. Blenkinsop was certainly Greiner's 23rd victory.

=== Normandy ===
The Western Allies began a policy of increasing attacks on the Belgian and French rail and communication networks in preparation for Overlord, and the D-Day landings. On 1/2 May 1944 131 Lancaster and eight Mosquito bombers belonging to No. 5 Group attacked the aircraft assembly and an explosives factories in Toulouse. Another 137 aircraft (89 Halifax, 40 Lancaster, 8 Mosquito bombers) from 6 and 8 Groups attacked the railway yards at Saint Ghislain. A follow-up raid 132 aircraft (110 Halifax, 14 Lancaster, 8 Mosquito bombers) of No. 4 and 8 Groups attacked railway targets at Malines. Chambly was also struck by 120 aircraft (96 Lancaster, 16 Stirling, 8 Mosquito bombers) of No. 3 and 8 Groups. 75 Lancasters of No. 1 Group attacked Berliet and Lyon. A further 46 Lancaster and four Mosquitos of No. 5 Group carried out an accurate attack on aircraft-repair workshops at Tours. 28 Mosquitos operated over Ludwigshafen and Achères, while another 34 intruder patrols were flown. 32 Halifax and three Stirlings took part of "Gardening" operations off the French coast and Frisian Islands. 40 aircraft flew supplies to the French Resistance also. Greiner was scrambled to intercept the stream heading to Saint Ghislain. At 00:15 south of Brussels Greiner claimed a Halifax. Flying west, Greiner attacked another northwest of Oudenaarde at 00:30. The last of the two inflated his tally to 25. On 9 May, and successive nights over the 12–13 May, and again on 25 May, Greiner claimed single victories against two Halifax and two Lancaster bombers. Greiner claimed his last victories of the month on 27/28 May. Bomber Command committed 331 heavy bombers against Leopoldsburg. At 02:29 and 02:48, Greiner claimed two Lancaster bombers, to bring his total to 31 bombers destroyed. The location of the engagements are recorded as Antwerp. The last was probably a Lancaster of No. 640 Squadron RAF piloted by Flying Officer F. Williams DFM, who was killed with two other crewmembers. The month of May was Greiner's most successful of the war.

On 1 June 1944 Greiner was promoted to Hauptmann. Five days later, Operation Overlord began with the Allied invasion of Normandy. 11./NJG 1, stayed in Sint-Truiden but extended its area of operations deep into France. Bomber Command sent out 225 Lancaster and 86 Halifax bombers to France supported by 18 Mosquitos on 15/16 June 1944. The No. 1, 3, 4 and 8 Groups attacked railway targets at Evreux, Gare de Massy – Palaiseau, Nantes and Tours. Near Paris at 01:26, Greiner claimed a Halifax for victory 32. On 15/16 June 1944, 227 aircraft (119 Lancaster, 99 Halifax and nine 9 Mosquito) from 4, 5 and 8 Groups attacked an ammunition dumps at Thorigné-Fouillard and a fuel dump at Châtellerault. The 5 Group raid at Châtellerault destroyed 8 fuel sites out of 35 in the target area without loss. 224 aircraft (184 Lancaster, 30 Stirling, 10 Mosquito bombers) of 3 and 8 Groups attacked railway yards at Lens and Valenciennes. Six Lancasters were lost from the Lens raid and five Lancasters from Valenciennes attack. 31 Mosquitos bombed to Gelsenkirchen, and 34 intruder patrols were carried out. Another seven Stirling and four Halifax bombers flew "Gardening" sorties minelaying off Channel ports. One Mosquito was lost from the Gelsenkirchen raid. Greiner attacked a Lancaster from an unknown bomber stream northeast of Lille at 00:56. On 5/6 July he claimed the second to last victory of the night over Dieppe at 02:05. On 20/21 July he claimed a victory in Grid LN-KN and KL at 01:28 and 01:37 for his 35th and 36th victories. On 27 July 1944, Greiner was awarded the Knight's Cross of the Iron Cross (Ritterkreuz des Eisernen Kreuzes) and the presentation was made by Generalleutnant Joseph Schmid.

=== Defence of the Reich ===
The German front in France and Belgium collapsed in August–September 1944 and NJG 1 was evacuated back to Germany and based at Dortmund on 2 September 1944. Greiner achieved his last victory at Sint Truiden on 12 August 1944. Bomber Command bombed Braunschweig with 242 Lancasters and 137 Halifaxes. 17 Lancasters and 10 Halifaxes were lost ( 7.1 per cent). 297 aircraft including 191 Lancasters, 96 Halifaxes and 10 Mosquitos attacked Rüsselsheim am Main. 13 Lancasters and seven Halifaxes were lost (6.7 per cent). The target for this raid was the Opel motor factory. Greiner intercepted a Lancaster west of Frankfurt and shot down his 37th bomber.

Soon after this mission Greiner was called into action again. On 12/13 September 1944, Greiner was ordered to intercept a 378-bomber raid heading for Frankfurt. That night he flew with his experienced radar operator Oberfeldwebel Rolf Kissing and a new, 18-year old gunner, Greiner was attacked by a de Havilland Mosquito night fighter. The first burst of fire hit Kissing in the head and the inexperienced gunner froze. The port engine was also shattered. The Mosquito did not attack again and out of consideration for Kissing, Greiner did not order a bale out or attempt a forced-landing. Instead he made a wheels-up landing at Düsseldorf airfield using compressed air to lower the landing-gear. Kissing died the same night. Greiner held his funeral oration with difficulty. Greiner's attacker is unknown. Flight Lieutenant R. D. Doleman and D. C. Bunch from No. 157 Squadron RAF plus Flight Lieutenant W. W. Provan and his radar operator, Warrant Officer Nicol from No. 29 Squadron RAF were the only No. 100 Group RAF Mosquito crews to file claims against Bf 110s in the Frankfurt area. Two other claims were filed for German aircraft shot down over southern Germany.

Greiner recovered from the death of Kissing and returned to operations within days. On 19–20 September 1944 Bomber Command struck Mönchengladbach with 227 Lancaster bombers and 10 Mosquitos from 1 and 5 Groups Greiner infiltrated the bomber stream west southwest of the city and at 22:55 and 23:02 claimed a Lancaster destroyed. On the 23/24 September 1944 Bomber Command attacked the Dortmund–Ems Canal with several hundred bombers. West southwest of Münster Greiner claimed a Lancaster bomber at 23:16 for his 40th victory.

=== Group commander ===
On 1 November, Greiner was promoted to Hauptmann (captain) and appointed Gruppenkommandeur of IV. Gruppe of NJG 1. He succeeded Major Heinz-Wolfgang Schnaufer in this capacity. On 4/5 November 1944 Greiner achieved two more successes against Lancasters at 19:21 and 19:35 west of Essen. Greiner's 42nd victory was his last in 1944.

On 5/6 January 1945 Greiner had his most successful patrol. Bomber Command attacked Hannover with 340 Halifax and 310 Lancaster bombers supported by 14 Mosquitos. 23 Halifax and eight Lancaster bombers were lost. Greiner claimed three Lancaster bombers in rapid succession over Hannover at 19:12, 19:15, 19:18. Greiner shot down his fourth of the night at 19:22. The claim was his 46th victory of the war. One of the bombers was Halifax LV952, MH-F, of No. 51 Squadron RAF. Only the gunner, Sergeant Don Thomsett, survived. He met Greiner in May 1998. On 21/22 February, Greiner shot down two Halifax bombers near Neuss at 23:31 and 23:40.

On 3 March 1945 No. 4 Group RAF was ordered to destroy the synthetic oil plant at Kamen while 5 Group would attempt to eliminate the aqueduct, safety gates, and canal boats on the Dortmund–Ems Canal at Ladbergen. Nearly 5,000 RAF airmen prepared to take part in 817 heavy bombers which were fueled and armed in the evening. The Luftwaffe planned a counter-attack this night. Named Operation Gisela, a large wave of night fighters were detailed to return with the bomber stream to their bases in England and attack them. Greiner was not scheduled to take part in the operation. His unit was ordered to engagement the incoming bomber stream. Near Dortmund at 21:57, 22:08 and 22:12 he claimed a Lancaster bomber. This brought his final tally to 51 Allied bombers destroyed—47 RAF and four USAAF. These interceptions were his last of the war.

On the night of 7/8 April 1945, he was ordered to intercept a Bomber Command attack on Dessau but became disorientated. The radio ceased working and the crew were lost. Fearing they were drifting eastwards towards Soviet lines, the crew sought to find a landmark without success. Greiner was low on fuel, he pointed the nose of the Bf 110 G-4 (Werknummer 160127—factory number) due west and flew for as long as possible until the tanks were exhausted. After bailing out Greiner's parachute became entangled on the night fighter for a brief time until it tore a strip away, freeing him and allowing Greiner to deploy the ripcord. Greiner was wounded when he landed requiring treatment in a hospital until the war ended. On 17 April 1945, Greiner became the 840th serviceman of the Wehrmacht to receive the Knight's Cross of the Iron Cross with Oak Leaves (Ritterkreuz des Eisernen Kreuzes mit Eichenlaub). He also received the Front Flying Clasp of the Luftwaffe for Night Fighters in Gold (Frontflugspange für Nachtjäger in Gold) for flying over 200 missions on 20 April 1945.

== Later life ==
Greiner was held as a prisoner of war. In the autumn, 1945, he was transferred to a prisoner of war camp run by the United States Army, near Frankfurt. Greiner was discharged and returned to his mother's home near Stuttgart. Months of inactivity Greiner yearned to fly again. He met with Heinz-Wolfgang Schnaufer to discuss the possibility of becoming a civil pilot and starting an aviation business. There was no opportunities in Europe or the United States. The two men decided to travel to South America to seek employment. The nearest consulates were in Bern, Switzerland. Greiner moved to the border town of Offenbach, across the frontier from Basel. After the arrangements with the embassies in Bern were made, they crossed the border on 23 September 1946. Schnaufer could not be away from his family's wine business for too long and suggested crossing the border illegally. The negotiations failed and the two were caught on their return. The Swiss handed Greiner and Schnaufer over to the French Army and imprisoned for six months without charge in Lörrach.

Greiner moved to Bonn and studied law. After marrying in 1949 he gave up his studies for financial reasons and became a sales representative for a textiles firm. In 1956 the Federal Republic of Germany was remilitarised and the Bundeswehr (German Armed Forces) was founded. Greiner joined the Bundesluftwaffe as Hauptmann in August 1957. Over the next 15 years he served at the Pilot's School at Landsberg, rising to the rank of Oberstleutnant (Lieutenant Colonel). Greiner retired in 1972. Greiner died on 26 September 2014 in Wangen im Allgäu.

== Summary of career ==
=== Aerial victory claims ===
According to Scutts, Greiner was credited with 51 aerial victories. Obermaier also lists him with 51 aerial victories, 47 nocturnal victories and four by daytime, claimed in 204 combat missions. Foreman, Parry and Mathews, authors of Luftwaffe Night Fighter Claims 1939 – 1945, researched the German Federal Archives and found records for 51 nocturnal victory claims Mathews and Foreman also published Luftwaffe Aces — Biographies and Victory Claims, listing Vinke with 48 claims, including four four-engined bombers by day, plus two further unconfirmed claims.

Victory claims were logged to a map-reference (PQ = Planquadrat), for example "PQ 05 Ost LN-KN". The Luftwaffe grid map (Jägermeldenetz) covered all of Europe, western Russia and North Africa and was composed of rectangles measuring 15 minutes of latitude by 30 minutes of longitude, an area of about 360 square miles (930 km^{2}). These sectors were then subdivided into 36 smaller units to give a location area 3 km × 4 km (1.9 mi × 2.5 mi) in size.

Chronicle of aerial victories
This and the – (dash) indicates unwitnessed aerial victory claims for which Greiner did not receive credit. This and the ? (question mark) indicates information discrepancies listed in Luftwaffe Night Fighter Claims 1939 – 1945 but not in Luftwaffe Aces — Biographies and Victory Claims.
Claim	Date	Time	Type	Location	Serial No./Squadron No.
– 10. Staffel of Nachtjagdgeschwader 1 –
1? (Note: According to Luftwaffe Aces — Biographies and Victory Claims, this claim was unconfirmed while Luftwaffe Night Fighter Claims 1939 – 1945 confirm this claim.)	26 June 1942	06:00	Wellington	south of Harlingen	Wellington DV935/No. 15 Operational Training Unit RAF
– 11. Staffel of Nachtjagdgeschwader 1 –
2	6 October 1942	23:24	Halifax	25 km (16 mi) west of Harlingen	Halifax W1189/No. 103 Squadron RAF
— (Note: This unconfirmed claim is listed in Luftwaffe Aces — Biographies and Victory Claims but not in Luftwaffe Night Fighter Claims 1939 – 1945.)	26 February 1943	02:52	Stirling	vicinity of Rastatt	Stirling BF410/No. 90 Squadron RAF
3? (Note: This claim is listed in Luftwaffe Night Fighter Claims 1939 – 1945 but not in Luftwaffe Aces — Biographies and Victory Claims.)	1 May 1943	02:52	Stirling	3.5 km (2.2 mi) southwest of Dokkum	
4?	5 May 1943	02:47	Halifax		
5	26 May 1943	03:05	Lancaster	35 km (22 mi) west of Den Helder	Wellington HE235/No. 166 Squadron RAF
6	26 May 1943	03:25	Lancaster	15 km (9.3 mi) north of Bergen aan Zee	Lancaster ED695/No. 467 Squadron RAAF
7	6 July 1943	02:31	Stirling	20 km (12 mi) northwest of Leeuwarden	Stirling EF436/No. 75 Squadron RNZAF
8	25 July 1943	02:50	Halifax	30 km (19 mi) southwest of Den Helder	Lancaster ED389/No. 103 Squadron RAF
9	3 August 1943	03:06	Lancaster	20 km (12 mi) northwest of Schiermonnikoog	Lancaster ED688/No. 100 Squadron RAF
10	3 August 1943	03:48	Wellington	20 km (12 mi) southwest of Schiermonnikoog	Wellington HE464/No. 166 Squadron RAF
– 10. Staffel of Nachtjagdgeschwader 1 –
11	24 August 1943	01:43	Halifax	northwest of Berlin	
12	22 September 1943	23:28	Halifax	Bergfeine	Halifax EB253/No. 76 Squadron RAF
13	23 September 1943	23:30	Lancaster	10 km (6.2 mi) south of Lampertheim	Lancaster W4991/No. 12 Squadron RAF
14	14 January 1944	20:00	Lancaster	vicinity of Saint-Dizier	
15	30 January 1944	13:00	B-17		B-17 42-31181/385th Bombardment Group
16	10 February 1944	12:25	B-17	near Osnabrück	
17	15 February 1944	22:59	Lancaster	beacon "Leopold" (Note: Beacon "Leopold"—Near Zeebrugge in approximately 50°20.86′N 3°12.18′E)	Lancaster JB420/No. 57 Squadron RAF
18	6 March 1944	12:46	B-17	11 km (6.8 mi) southwest of Quakenbrück	
19	6 March 1944	13:53	B-24	Münsterbrück	
– 11. Staffel of Nachtjagdgeschwader 1 –
20	23 April 1944	01:39	Lancaster	10 km (6.2 mi) northwest of Düsseldorf	
21	25 April 1944	02:18	Halifax	vicinity of Breda	Halifax MZ503/No. 420 Squadron RCAF
22	28 April 1944	01:58	Lancaster	6 km (3.7 mi) west of Genk	Halifax LK842/No. 431 (Iroquois) Squadron RCAF
23	28 April 1944	02:00	Halifax	2 km (1.2 mi) southeast of Oerle	
24	2 May 1944	00:15	Halifax	15 km (9.3 mi) south of Brussels	
25	2 May 1944	00:30	Halifax	2 km (1.2 mi) northwest of Oudenaarde	
26	9 May 1944	03:57	Halifax	24 km (15 mi) north-northeast of Kortrijk	Halifax MZ521/No. 431 (Iroquois) Squadron RCAF
27	12 May 1944	00:27	Halifax	Leuven	Lancaster LL752/No. 15 Squadron RAF
28	13 May 1944	00:27	Halifax	Lieren, near Appeldoorn	
29	25 May 1944	00:29	Lancaster	10 km (6.2 mi) south of Aachen	
30	28 May 1944	02:29	Lancaster		
31	28 May 1944	02:48	Lancaster		
32	11 June 1944	01:26	Halifax		
33	16 June 1944	00:56	Lancaster	20–30 km (12–19 mi) northeast of Lille	
34	5 July 1944	02:05	Halifax	vicinity of Dieppe	
35	21 July 1944	01:28	Lancaster	PQ 05 Ost LN-KN	Lancaster HK571/No. 514 Squadron RAF
36	21 July 1944	01:37	Lancaster	PQ 05 Ost KL	Lancaster ND752/No. 75 Squadron RNZAF
37	13 August 1944	00:26	Lancaster	west of Frankfurt am Main	
38	19 September 1944	22:55	Lancaster	west-southwest of Mönchengladbach	
39	19 September 1944	23:02	Lancaster	west-southwest of Mönchengladbach	Lancaster PB405/No. 619 Squadron RAF
40	23 September 1944	23:16	Lancaster	west-southwest of Münster	Lancaster ME732/No. 61 Squadron RAF
41	4 November 1944	19:21	Halifax	west of Essen	
42	4 November 1944	19:35	Halifax	west of Essen	
43	5 January 1945	19:12	Lancaster	vicinity of Hannover	
44	5 January 1945	19:15	Lancaster	vicinity of Hannover	
45	5 January 1945	19:18	Lancaster	vicinity of Hannover	Halifax NP817/No. 432 Squadron RCAF
46	5 January 1945	19:22	Halifax	vicinity of Hannover	Halifax NZ360/No. 77 Squadron RAF
47	21 February 1945	23:31	Halifax	vicinity of Neuss	
48	21 February 1945	23:40	Halifax	vicinity of Neuss	
49	3 March 1945	21:57	Lancaster	vicinity of Dortmund	
50	3 March 1945	22:08	Lancaster	vicinity of Dortmund	
51	3 March 1945	22:12	Lancaster	vicinity of Dortmund	

=== Awards ===
- Iron Cross (1939)
  - 2nd Class (26 June 1942)
  - 1st Class (1 June 1943)
- Front Flying Clasp of the Luftwaffe
  - in Bronze on 1 October 1942
  - in Silver on 4 September 1943
  - in Gold on 15 February 1944
- Honor Goblet of the Luftwaffe on 28 February 1944 as Oberleutnant and pilot. (Note: According to Obermaier on 26 December 1943.)
- German Cross in Gold on 29 March 1944 as Oberleutnant in the 10./Nachtjagdgeschwader 1
- Knight's Cross of the Iron Cross with Oak Leaves
  - Knight's Cross on 27 July 1944 as Oberleutnant and Staffelkapitän of the 11./Nachtjagdgeschwader 1
  - 840th Oak Leaves on 17 April 1945 as Hauptmann and Gruppenkommandeur of the IV./Nachtjagdgeschwader 1

== Notes ==
Military offices
Preceded by Major Heinz-Wolfgang Schnaufer	Commander of IV. Gruppe of Nachtjagdgeschwader 1; 1 November 1944 – 8 May 1945	Succeeded by None
