= Schaffen Air Base =

Air Base in Flemish Brabant, Belgium

Schaffen Air Base Vliegveld Schaffen
- IATA: none; ICAO: EBDT

Summary
- Airport type: Military
- Owner/Operator: Belgian Armed Forces
- Location: Diest, Flemish Brabant, Belgium
- Built: 1914
- In use: 1918-1940 (pre-WW2); 1945-Present (post-WW2)
- Occupants: Belgian Air Component; Special Operations Regiment
- Coordinates: 51°00′07″N 005°03′52″E

Maps
- Location within Belgium
- Interactive map of Schaffen Air Base

Runways
Direction	Length		Surface
Direction	m	ft	Surface
04/22	610	2,001	Grass

Schaffen Air Base is a Belgian Air Force Base, located 2.1 km (1.3 mi) north-northeast of Diest in Flemish Brabant, Belgium.

The airfield is currently the Training Center for Parachutists (TrgC Para) of the Belgian ParaCommandos.

== History ==
=== Origins ===
Schaffen Air Base was originally established about 1914 by the invading Imperial German Army during World War I. The Imperial German Air Service (Die Fliegertruppen) used it as an airfield before withdrawing in November 1918 after the Armistice with Germany.

=== Battle of Belgium ===
Between the wars, the airfield was a major base for the Belgian Air Force. In early 1940, about half of the Belgian Air Force, were stationed there prior to the Battle of Belgium in May. On the early morning of 10 May, the alarm was sounded, and the pilots at Schaffen Air Base went to their planes, thinking it was an exercise. A few minutes later, 50 unidentified aircraft flew over the airfield. At 4:20am Belgian Hawker Hurricanes at the airfield started their engines. 12 minutes later, three Luftwaffe Heinkel He-111s were spotted, not troubled by AAA fire. The 111s strafed the airfield several times. The Belgian planes tried to take off through the explosions and fires. Minutes later Me-110s and Dornier Do-17s strafed and bombed the airfield. Four Hurricanes were set on fire, and 6 others were damaged. The roof of the hangar fell in and the planes in it were destroyed. By 5:30 AM, only five aircraft remained operational, two Hawker Hurricanes and three Glosters. After the attack, the survivors were flown off and the airfield abandoned.

=== Luftwaffe Use ===
During the German occupation of Belgium, Sturzkampfgeschwader 1 (StG 1) formed at Schaffen as Erg.Staffel/St.G.1. It operated Ju-87 Stuka dive bombers from the field, attacking British shipping in the English Channel. The Stukas, however, suffered significant losses against RAF fighters over the channel and were withdrawn in August to bases in the Balkans. For the remainder of the occupation, Schaffen was a non-combat airfield of the Flughafen-Bereichs-Kommando 22/XI (Airport-area command 22/XI).

=== Royal Air Force Use ===
The British Army moved through the Diest area, clearing the occupying German forces north into The Netherlands. Royal Engineers moved into the airfield and it was re-designated as Advanced Landing Ground B-64. It is unknown which RAF units used the field until the German Capitulation in May 1945.

=== Postwar use ===
After the war Schaffen became the location of the Belgian Air Force elementary fying school (French: Ecole de Pilotage Elémentaire; Dutch: Elementaire Vliegschool). In 1950 the EVS left for Air Base Goetsenhoven however. Schaffen Air Base has also been the home of the Training Center for Parachutists (TrgC Para) of the Belgian ParaCommandos since 1946. It is also used for recreational flying, both gliding and motorised, by Diest Aeroclub. They also host a yearly Old-Timer Flyin.
