= Roderick Aeneas Chisholm =

British flying ace of the Second World War

- Born: 23 November 1911; Bridge of Allan, Scotland
- Died: 7 December 1994 (aged 83)
- Military career
- Allegiance: United Kingdom
- Branch: Royal Air Force
- Service years: 1930–1935; 1939–1946
- Rank: Air Commodore
- Nickname: Rory
- Commands: Fighter Interception Unit (1942–43)
- Conflicts: Second World War: The Blitz
- Awards: Commander of the Order of the British Empire; Distinguished Service Order; Distinguished Flying Cross & Bar; Mentioned in Despatches (2)

Air Commodore Roderick Aeneas Chisholm, CBE, DSO, DFC & Bar (23 November 1911 – 7 December 1994) was a British night fighter pilot, flying ace—a title awarded to a pilot credited with shooting down at least five enemy aircraft in aerial combat—and a highly decorated British airman of the Second World War. As a night fighter pilot, he was credited with at least nine aerial victories.

== Early life ==
Roderick Aeneas Chisholm was born on 23 November 1911 at Bridge of Allan in Scotland. He went to school at Ampleforth College and commenced tertiary studies at the Imperial College of Science and Technology. In 1930 he joined the Auxiliary Air Force and served with No. 604 Squadron, based at Hendon. Commencing flying training on Westland Wapiti trainer aircraft in October, he was commissioned as a pilot officer the following year in March 1931. Four months later he was the pilot of a Wapiti that crashed at Tangmere while carrying his commanding officer, Air Commodore McNeece Foster, as a passenger.

Promoted to flying officer in 1932, Chisholm ended his service in the AAF three years later and went onto the Reserve of Air Force Officers. Employed in the oil industry, in 1936 he went to the Middle East to work there.

== Second World War ==
Still in the Middle East on the outbreak of the Second World War, Chisholm presented himself for service in the Royal Air Force (RAF). Undergoing initial entry at RAF headquarters in Iraq, by February 1940 he was back in the United Kingdom. He underwent a conversion course at No. 3 Flying Training School at South Cerney and in June was posted back to No. 604 Squadron. At the time, the squadron was equipped with Bristol Blenheim heavy fighters and were operating in a night fighter role from Gravesend although it would subsequently move to Middle Wallop. No. 604 Squadron served throughout the Battle of Britain, often on search and rescue missions as well as daylight patrols. The primitive radar that were provided to its Blenheims was problematic and nighttime successes were rare.

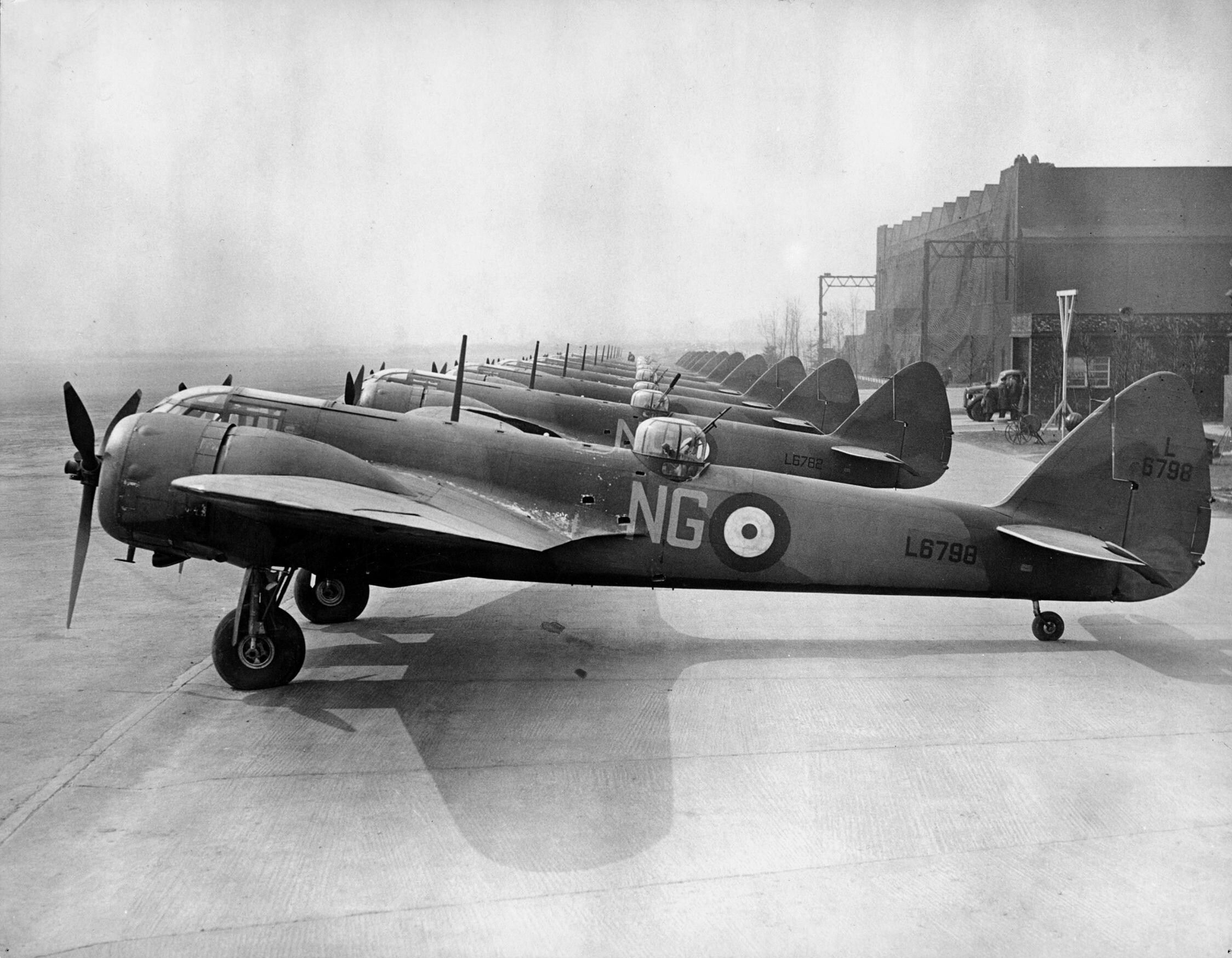
Bristol Blenheim heavy fighters of No. 604 Squadron, 1940

=== The Blitz ===
In September No. 604 Squadron began converting to the Bristol Beaufighter heavy fighter and soon, with the Blitz underway, it began make successful interceptions of German bombers at night. Chisholm's first claimed successes were on the night of 13 March when, guided by his radar operator W. Ripley, he destroyed a pair of Heinkel He 111 medium bombers to the south of the Isle of Wight. This later led to an award of the Distinguished Flying Cross (DFC) for Chisholm; the published citation for his DFC read:

This officer has completed many hours operational flying at night. He has at all times shown the greatest keenness and determination to seek and destroy the enemy and, during one night in March, 1941, he succeeded in destroying two Heinkel 111's.

— London Gazette, No. 35134, 11 April 1941

Chisholm destroyed two more He 111s on the night of 9 April, one near Ringwood and the other over the English Channel near Boscombe. Two days later he shot down a He 111 to the south of Bournemouth and probably destroyed a Junkers Ju 88 medium bomber inland of Poole Harbour. On 29 April he shot down a He 111 over Middle Wallop. His last aerial victories of the year were on the night of 8 July, when he destroyed one He 111 to the east of Exeter and damaged a second. Rested from operations in January 1942, Chisholm, now in the rank of squadron leader, was awarded a Bar to his DFC the following month. The published citation read:

Since being awarded the Distinguished Flying Cross in March, 1941, this officer has destroyed 5 enemy bombers at night, thus bringing his victories to 7 destroyed. By his exceptional skill, Squadron Leader Chisholm has been largely responsible for the high standard of efficiency shown by his flight.

— London Gazette, No. 35451, 10 February 1942

After two months service as a fighter controller at Middle Wallop, Chisholm took up a posting at the headquarters of No. 81 Group in March, where he coordinated the training of night fighter crews around the country. In June, and now holding the rank of wing commander, he took command of the Fighter Interception Unit (FIU) at Ford. This was involved in the development of night fighter tactics and equipment, often testing these on operational sorties to German-occupied Europe. On one such occasion, while flying a de Havilland Mosquito heavy fighter on the night of 2 July 1943, Chisholm destroyed a Ju 88 some 45 miles (72 km) south of Bognor. He shot down a Messerschmitt Bf 110 heavy fighter over Mannheim on the night of 18 November.

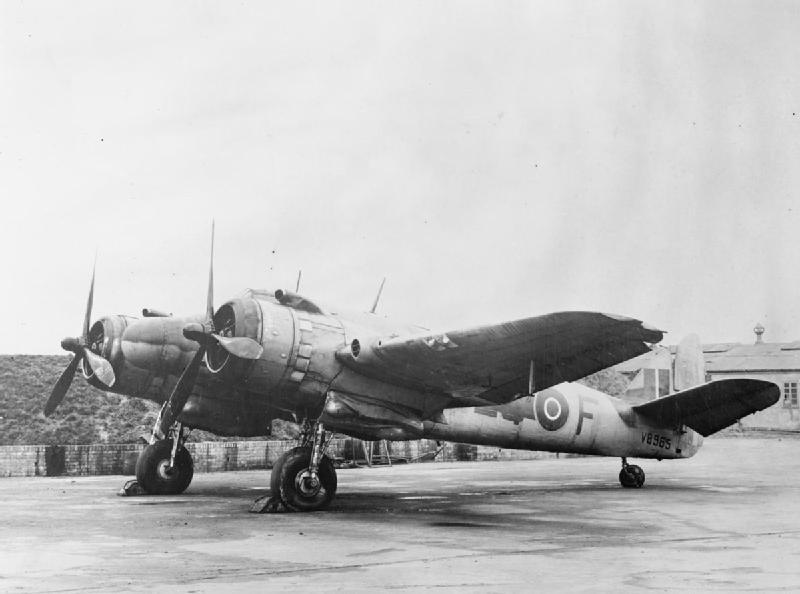
A radar-equipped Bristol Beaufighter of the Fighter Interception Unit

=== Later wartime service ===
Chisholm championed radar-equipped night fighter intruder operations over Europe to apply pressure to the German air defence system and reduce losses to Bomber Command. In late 1943, he was appointed to the staff of a new organisation, designated No. 100 Group, created for this purpose. In early 1944, Chisholm was awarded the Distinguished Service Order (DSO) in recognition of his work at the FIU. The citation for the DSO was published in The London Gazette and read:

This officer has completed an extremely large number of sorties at night during which he has destroyed 9 enemy aircraft. He has displayed exceptional skill and keenness and, both in the air and on the ground, his outstanding qualities and personal example have contributed materially to the efficiency of the unit he commands.

— London Gazette, No. 36329, 14 January 1944

Mentioned in Dispatches at the start of 1945, by the end of the war in Europe, Chisholm held the rank of air commodore and was based in Germany. On 14 June, he was again mentioned in dispatches. His duties at this time involved gathering information on German tactics and technology used against British bombers by interviewing former Luftwaffe personnel.

Chisholm is credited with the destruction of nine aircraft. He also damaged one aircraft and is believed to have probably destroyed one other.

== Later life ==
In January 1946, Chisholm was appointed Commander of the Order of the British Empire (CBE) in the New Year Honours. He ended his service in the RAF the same month and returned to the oil industry. He subsequently wrote a book about his wartime experiences entitled Cover of Darkness, published in 1953 by Chatto & Windus (ISBN 978-1913518752 2020 reprint). He retired in 1970 and spent at least some of his final years living in Hampshire. He died on 7 December 1994.
