= Front Flying Clasp of the Luftwaffe =

Front Flying Clasp of the Luftwaffe Frontflugspange
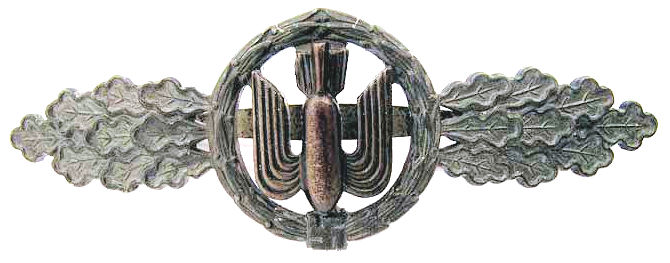
- Front Flying Clasp for Bombers
- Type: Clasp
- Awarded for: number of operational flights flown
- Presented by: Nazi Germany
- Eligibility: Military personnel
- Campaign: World War II
- Established: 30 January 1941
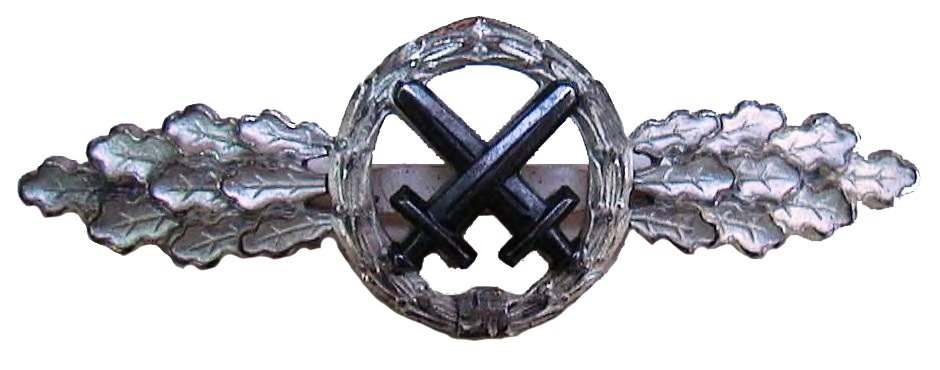
- Front Flying Clasp for Air to Ground Support Fighters

The Front Flying Clasp of the Luftwaffe (German: Frontflugspange) was a World War II German military decoration awarded to aircrew and certain other Luftwaffe personnel in recognition of the number of operational flights flown. It was instituted by Reichsmarschall Hermann Göring on 30 January 1941. It was awarded in Bronze, Silver, and Gold with an upgrade to include diamonds possible. Pennants suspended from the clasp indicated the number of missions obtained in a given type of aircraft. Front Flying Clasps were issued for missions completed in the following Luftwaffe aircraft:

- Day Fighters
- Night Fighters
- Long Range Night Fighters
- Heavy Fighters
- Air to Ground Support Fighters
- Bombers
- Reconnaissance
- Transport and Glider

The different clasps were inaugurated on:

- 30 January 1941 for the Front Flying Clasp
- 26 June 1942 for the Pennant to the Gold Front Flying Clasp
- 29 April 1944 for the Pennant with number of mission

== Design ==
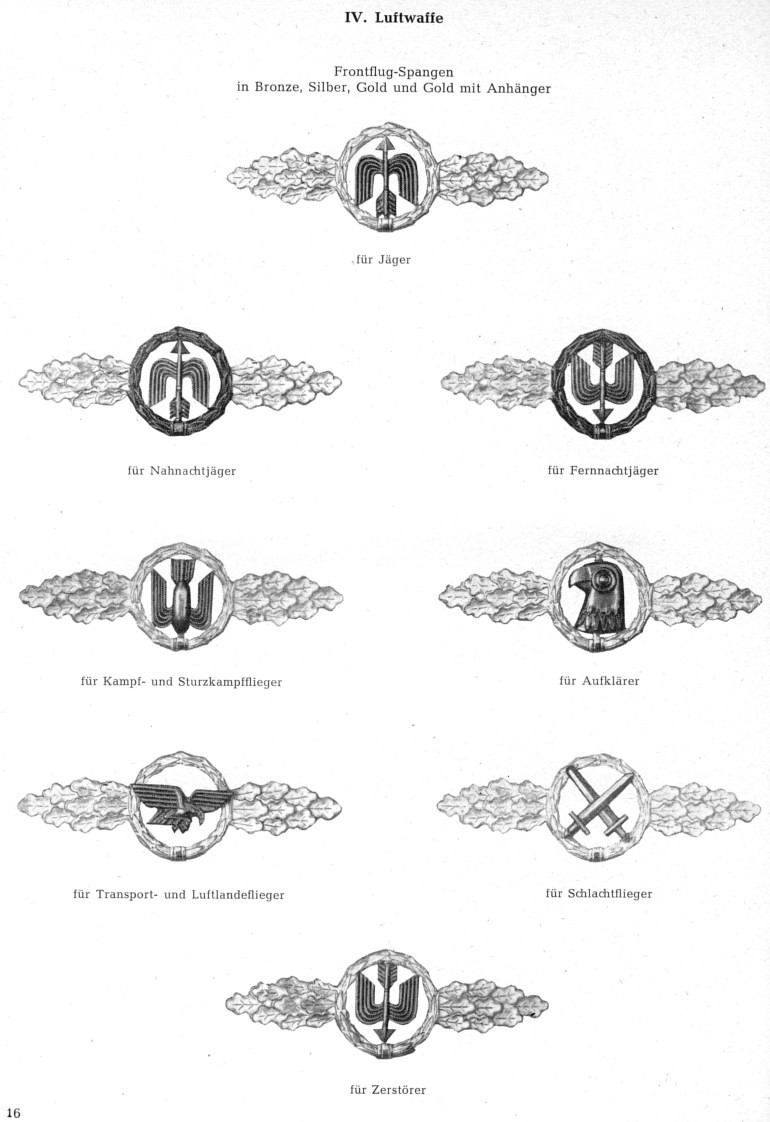
Denazified versions 1957

All badges are formed of a central device (usually blackened) encircled by a wreath of laurel leaves set between two stylized wings of oak leaves with a swastika located at the base of the wreath. Clasps measure approximately 7.5 cm (3 in) by 2.5 cm (1 in). The various designs of the central device was determined from the type of aircraft flown. The clasp pennant was instituted as additional recognition for the increased number of operational missions/flights, which grew as the war continued. As part of the post-war program of the German Denazification, in 1957 these clasps were made available for wear with their Swastika emblems removed.

== Criteria for qualification ==
- Bronze - 20 flown missions
- Silver - 60 flown missions
- Gold - 110 flown missions

Pennant to the Gold Front Flying Clasp

- Day Fighters and Transport Units: 500 missions
- Air to Ground Support Fighters: 400 missions
- Bombers, Air Sea Rescue and Weather Reconnaissance: 300 missions
- Reconnaissance and Night Fighters: 250 missions
