= The Blackeyed Susans discography =

- Studio albums: 7
- Extended plays: 4
- Live albums: 1
- Compilation albums: 1
- Singles: 8

The following is a discography of albums, EPs and singles released by the Australian band The Blackeyed Susans.

== Studio albums ==
Year	Album details
1992	Welcome Stranger: Released: August 1992; Label: Waterfront (DAMP 171); Format: CD
1993	All Souls Alive: Released: December 1993; Label: Torn and Frayed/Shock (Torn CD5); Format: CD
1994	Hard Liquor, Soft Music (Note: Hard Liquor, Soft Music was released as being by The Blackeyed Susans Trio, which comprised Phil Kakulas, Rob Snarski and Kiernan Box.): Released: 1994; Label: Independent; Format: Cassette
1995	Mouth To Mouth: Released: July 1995; Label: Hi Gloss (HIG006); Format: CD
1997	Spin The Bottle: Released: July 1997; Label: Hi Gloss (HIG015); Format: CD
2001	Dedicated To The Ones We Love: Released: 23 April 2001; Label: Teardrop (BS693); Format: CD
2003	Shangri-La: Released: 21 July 2003; Label: Teardrop (BS694); Format: CD
2017	Close Your Eyes And See: Released: 3 March 2017; Label: Teardrop (BS699); Format: CD

== Live albums ==
Year	Album details
1996	Some Night, Somewhere (Note: Some Night, Somewhere was included as a Christmas bonus disc, with copies of Mouth To Mouth sold around December, 1996.): Released: December 1996; Label: Hi Gloss (HIGPR01); Format: CD

== Extended plays ==
Year	Album details
1989	Some Births Are Worse Than Murders: Released: March 1989; Label: Waterfront (DAMP 127); Format: CD
1991	Anchor Me: Released: March 1991; Label: Waterfront (DAMP 164); Format: CD
1991	...Depends On What You Mean By Love: Released: 1991; Label: Waterfront (DAMP 165); Format: CD
1998	La Mascara: Released: December 1998; Label: Hi Gloss (HIG 025); Format: CD

== Compilation albums ==
Year	Album details
2009	Reveal Yourself 1989-2009: Released: 30 October 2009; Label: Liberation (LMCD0057); Format: CD/DVD

== Singles ==
Year	Title	Album
1994	"This One Eats Souls"	All Souls Alive
1994	"Dirty Water"	All Souls Alive
1995	"Let's Live"	Mouth to Mouth
1996	"Mary Mac"	Mouth to Mouth
1997	"Smokin' Johnny Cash"	Spin the Bottle
1997	"Spin The Wheel"	Spin the Bottle
1998	"Blue Skies, Blue Sea"	Spin the Bottle
2001	"Private Dancer" (Note: "Private Dancer" was a promotional release only)	Dedicated To The Ones We Love
