= Welcome Stranger (album) =

Studio album by The Blackeyed Susans
- Released: August 1992
- Recorded: Perth – March, 1989; Sydney – March, 1991; London – 1990
- Genre: Rock / Folk rock
- Length: 54:42
- Label: Waterfront Records
- Producer: James Hewgill and The Blackeyed Susans (1–4); Phillip Kakulas and The Blackeyed Susans (5–8 & 15); David McComb (9–14)

The Blackeyed Susans chronology
Depends on What You Mean By Love (1991)	Welcome Stranger (1992)	All Souls Alive (1993)

Welcome Stranger is the debut studio album by The Blackeyed Susans. Released in August, 1992, the album is a compilation of their first three EPs – Some Births are Worse than Murders, Anchor Me and …Depends On What You Mean By Love – with the addition of three tracks recorded at the same time as the material released on those EPs.

== Track listing ==
1. "Don’t Call Yourself An Angel" (McComb, Kakulas) – 3:14
2. "Enemy Mine" (McComb, Kakulas) – 4:07
3. "Viva Las Vegas" (Doc Pomus, Mort Shuman) – 5:10
4. "Cripple Creek" (Traditional/Kakulas) – 4:47
5. "Glory Glory" (Kakulas) – 4:03
6. "Anchor Me" (Snarski) – 2:43
7. "Who’s That By The Window?" (Kakulas) – 2:50
8. "Trouble" (Kakulas, Rollinson) – 4:13
9. "Ocean of You" (McComb) – 3:33
10. "Close Watch" (John Cale) – 2:59
11. "Will’s Blues" (Akers) – 3:22
12. "Spanish Is The Loving Tongue" (Traditional) – 2:59
13. "Who’s Loving You" (Robinson) – 3:08
14. "It Hurts Me" (Byers, Daniels)/"Prisoner of Love" (Robin, Columbo, Gaskill) – 3:42
15. "In The Pines" (McComb) – 3:44

== Personnel ==
=== Tracks 1–4 ===
- David McComb – vocals, guitar, percussion
- Rob Snarski – vocals, guitar
- Phil Kakulas – double bass, electric bass, bazouki, guitar, backing vocals, percussion
- Alsy MacDonald – drums, percussion
- Ross Bolleter – hammond organ, piano, piano organ
- William Akers – backing vocals

=== Tracks 5–8 and 15 ===
- Rob Snarski – vocals, acoustic guitar
- Kathryn Wemyss – vocals, trumpet, castanets
- Phillip Kakulas – double bass
- Timothy Rollinson – electric guitar
- Kenny Davis Junior – piano, piano accordion
- James Cruikshank – organ
- Graham Lee – pedal steel
- Mark Dawson – percussion

=== Tracks 9–14 ===
- Rob Snarski – vocals
- Kenny Davis Junior – keyboards, piano accordion, samples
- David McComb – keyboards, bass, electric and acoustic guitars, backing vocals
- Joanne Alach – backing vocals

== Charts ==
Chart (1992)	Peak position
Australian Albums (ARIA)	149
