= Murdin =

Murdin is a surname. Notable people with the surname include:

- John Murdin (1891–1971), English cricketer
- Paul Murdin (born 1942), British astronomer

== See also ==
- Mudin
- Murin (surname)
