= Lindsay Vickery =

Australian composer and performer (born 1965)

Lindsay Vickery (born 11th September 1965) is an Australian composer and performer. He is currently coordinator of Composition and Sonic Arts at the Western Australian Academy of Performing Arts (WAAPA).

== Early life and education ==
Lindsay Ross Vickery was born in Subiaco, Perth. He attended Churchlands Senior High School, where he learned the clarinet. He studied composition with John Exton and Roger Smalley at the School of Music, University of Western Australia, where he earned a Bachelor of Music Education and later a Master of Music. He has written much ensemble and interactive electronic music, exploring readymades and collage (notably interrogating the work of Charlie Parker) as well as improvisation, nonlinear writing and computer-performer pieces. His chamber opera Rendez-vous: An Opera Noir is based on the Nouveau Roman DJINN: un trou rouge entre les pavés disjoints by French author Alain Robbe-Grillet. Vickery earned his PhD from the Queensland University of Technology in 2013.

== Career ==
His interactive electronic music often employs experimental interfaces such as the Yamaha MIBURI and other self-devised alternative controllers.

He has performed on reed instruments, electronics or as a conductor in the groups alea new music ensemble, Magnetic Pig, HEDKIKR, SQUINT, Candied Limbs and Decibel, and with artists such as Jon Rose (Music in the Age of Shopping, The People’s Music), Stelarc, Amy Knoles and Cat Hope. His works have been performed by groups such as The California Ear Unit, Topology, Clocked Out, Ensemble Scintilla Divina, the MATA Ensemble, The Collective and artists such as Michael Kieran Harvey, Ross Bolleter and Hiroshi Chu Okubo.

He has performed at the Shanghai International Arts Festival, Sydney Festival, Perth International Arts Festival, Adelaide Festival of Arts, Music at the Anthology, Totally Huge New Music Festival, Scintilla Divina Festival, Audio Art Festival, NWEAMO, REV01, BEAP, the NowNow, What is Music, The Knitting Factory, Make-it-Now, DC 8th International Dance+ Improvisation Festival, SDSU, University of Illinois, STEIM, HarvestWorks, CEMI and Kyoto Seika University.

== Honours and awards ==
Honours include a Sounds Australian Award (1989) and a Churchill Fellowship (1995) to study electronic music in the United States and Europe.

== Selected works ==
- Twilight's Last Gleamings (1986): in Reeds (Ed. Ross Hazeldine) Red House Editions RH943
- Savoy Trifle (1988): Alto Saxophone, Percussion and Piano
- Blackpool Tower: Elegy for John Lennon (1989): Clarinet, Guitar, Percussion and Piano
- Leo Szilard (1990): Soprano, Tenor and Baritone Saxophone, Piano, Marimba, Cello and Bass Guitar
- cyphers of the obscure gods (1991): Tenor Saxophone, Cello, Synthesizer and Percussion
- Zealous Activity (1992): in Australian Piano Miniatures (Ed. Ross Hazeldine) Red House Editions RH947
- Web of Indra (1993): Soprano Saxophone, Cello, Percussion and Keyboard
- [descent of the celestial monkey wrench] (1997), 2 Sopranos, saxophone, cello, piano and percussion
- strange tides (redraw my boundaries) (1997): solo soprano saxophone and digital delay
- Oubliette (1998): in Australian Guitar Miniatures (Ed. Ross Hazeldine) Red House Editions RH947
- whythisandnotanother? (1999): score-film, interactive audio, saxophone, cello, and KAT
- noir (1999): MIBURI, Roland 505, tenor saxophone, piano, samplers and MIDI controlled lights
- horology (1999): flute, clarinet, violin, cello, piano and marimba and percussion
- delicious ironies series (2001–): live instrument(s) and electronics
- rendez-vous: an opera noir (2001): after the Novel Djinn by Alain Robbe-Grillet. Libretto by the Composer: 2 Sopranos, Mezzo, Baritone, Boy Actor and Male Actor, Violin, Cello, Saxophone, Piano,
- Splice (2002): soloist and Max/MSP software
- invisible symmetries (2002): violin, soprano saxophone, double bass, percussion and piano
- InterXection (2002): percussion and electronics
- your sky is filled with billboards of the sky (2002): MIBURI, Max/MSP and Image-ine.
- Scan (2002): MIBURI and interactive video/sound
- Kreuz des Suedens (2003): violin and cello
- Hey Jazz Fans! (2003): solo alto saxophone and MAX/MSP
- Parallel Trajectories (2003): ensemble
- Exit Points (2003): soprano saxophone, violin, viola, double bass, piano
- éraflage (2007): flute, harp, string quartet, double bass and percussion
- Tectonic (2007), wind, brass, string, percussion and piano groups and electronics
- corridors, stairways, night and day (2009): bass clarinet and interactive electronics
- Antibody (2009): alto flute, clarinet, viola, cello, keyboard and electronics

With Graham Collier

- Bread and Circuses (Jazzprint, 2002)
