= Tim Rollinson (musician) =

- Born: Timothy Robert Rollinson; 1959 (age 66–67); Bolton, England
- Genres: Jazz
- Occupations: Musician, songwriter
- Instrument: Guitar
- Years active: 1979–present
- Labels: ID, Mercury, Rufus/UMA
- Website: timrollinson.com

Timothy Robert Rollinson (born 1959) is an English-born Australian jazz guitarist and composer who was a founder of the acid jazz group Directions in Groove (D.I.G.) (1991–1998, 2008) as well as his own trio, quartets and studio project, The Modern Congress. His work for D.I.G. included winning two APRA Awards for song writing, 1994 'Best Jazz Composition' for "Favourite" and 1996 'Most Performed Jazz Work' for "Futures". As well as two ARIA Music Award nominations, 1994 'Breakthrough Artist – Single' for "Re-Invent Yourself" and 1995 'Breakthrough Artist – Album' for Deeper. He released two solo albums, Cause and Effect in 1997 and You Tunes in 2010. He has worked on many albums with many artists, including 4 albums with Steve Morrison plus tours with Morrison.

== Biography ==
Rollinson was born in 1959 in Bolton, England. He joined cabaret band Pressed Meat & the Smallgoods in Sydney in mid-1989 on guitar which included Kathy Wemyss (ex-Chad's Tree). Both were recruited to perform and record with The Blackeyed Susans from late 1990 to early 1991. The group had formed in Perth, Western Australia in 1989 and relocated to Sydney and collected new members.

In 1991 Rollinson was the founding guitarist for acid jazz group Directions in Groove (D.I.G.). He contributed song writing to the group's three albums. Rollinson released a solo album, Cause and Effect in 1997 on Mercury Records. The third album for D.I.G., Curvystrasse, followed in 1998 and the group disbanded thereafter. They briefly reformed in 2008 for the Remixed Live Tour. His work for D.I.G. included winning two APRA Awards for song writing, 1994 'Best Jazz Composition' for "Favourite" and 1996 'Most Performed Jazz Work' for "Futures". As well as two ARIA Music Award nominations, 1994 'Breakthrough Artist – Single' for "Re-Invent Yourself" and 1995 'Breakthrough Artist – Album' for Deeper.

Rollinson has performed with Vince Jones, Louis Tillett, Tim Hopkins, Tony Buck, Joe Lane, Barney McAll and David Watson.

Rollinson has written music for theatre, short films, two features and for television. He released his second solo album, You Tunes, on Rufus Records in June 2010.

== Discography ==
=== Albums ===
Band member, solo projects

Year	Title	Artist	Label	Details
1992	Directions in Groove	D.I.G. (Directions in Groove)	ID 0009-2	
1995	Deeper	D.I.G.	Verve/ID 5 186092	March 1995
1995	Speakeasy	D.I.G.	Verve Forecast 5285392	June 1995
1996	Crime	D.I.G.	Verve Forecast 852942	
1997	Cause and Effect	Tim Rollinson	Mercury Records 5329072	
1998	Curvystrasse	D.I.G.	EMI 97196	September 1998
2003	D.I.G. Live	D.I.G.	Watt003	Live at Milton Theatre and The Basement in January 1999
2005	The Hidden Soul of Harmony	The Modern Congress	CDD006	
2010	You Tunes	Tim Rollinson	Rufus Records/UMA	1 June 2010
2016	Nitty Gritty	Tim Rollinson		
2019	Old New Blues	Tim Rollinson		

Guest musician

- Anchor Me (EP) – The Blackeyed Susans (March 1991, Waterfront Records)
- 1991 Peter Dasent Dir: Peter Jackson Meet The Feebles Q.D.K Media
- 1991 Grant McLennan (Go-Betweens) Watershed White Label
- Welcome Stranger – The Blackeyed Susans (August 1992, Waterfront)
- 1992 Caroline Loftus Sugar Larrikin
- 1993 Ian Cooper Soundpost Larrikin
- 1994 Tim Hopkins Pandora’s Box ABC
- 1994 Peggy Van Zalm Shine / Soul Magic
- 1997 Zeek’s Beek Zeek’s Beek ABC Jazz
- 2004 Inga Liljestrom Elk
- 2007 Steve Morrison and Jeff Duff So Quiet
- 2007 Dave Mason (The Reels) Reelsville
- 2007 Betty Vale Red
- 2009 Steve Morrison Live at the Basement
- 2009 Gerard Masters Spin (EP)
- 2011 Steve Morrison

Seventy times seven

- 2025 Steve Morrison

Planet funky bass

- 2026 Mark Cloros album (not released yet)

=== Compilation albums ===
- 2005 Australia Select 3 National Gallery Of Victoria
- 2005 Lazy Days & Sundays 2 Instinctive Travels
- 2005 Bondi Calling 3 Vitamin
- 2005 Vine Time Instinctive Travels
- 2005 Mi Casa Tu Casa Casa Del Discos
- 2001 State Of The Union EMF (US release)
- 1998 Groove Hip Hop Blue Note
- 1995 The Soul Of Jazz Volume 3 Verve (Europe)
- 1993 Triple J Live At The Wireless 3 ABC
- 1991 Triple J Live At The Wireless Mushroom
