= Dirty Water (The Blackeyed Susans song) =

Single by The Blackeyed Susans

from the album All Souls Alive
- Released: July 1994
- Recorded: Fortissimo Studios; July 1993
- Genre: Rock / Folk rock
- Length: 18:45
- Label: Shock Records
- Songwriter(s): Phil Kakulas; Peggy Van Zalm
- Producer(s): Phil Kakulas

The Blackeyed Susans singles chronology
"This One Eats Souls" (1994)	"Dirty Water" (1994)	"Let's Live" (1995)

"Dirty Water" is a single by The Blackeyed Susans, released in July, 1994, from their 1993 album, All Souls Alive. The last four tracks are taken from the cassette album Hard Liquor, Soft Music by The Blackeyed Susans Trio.

== Track listing ==
1. "Dirty Water" (Phil Kakulas, Peggy Van Zalm) – 4:54
2. "Trouble" (Phil Kakulas, Tim Rollinson) – 3:26
3. "20/20 Vision" (Joe Allison, Milton Estes) – 3:21
4. "Happiness" (Appel) – 3:40
5. "Lonesome Town" (Baker Knight) – 3:24

== Personnel ==
=== Track 1 ===
- Rob Snarski – vocals
- Phil Kakulas – electric bass
- Graham Lee – electric and acoustic guitars, backing vocals
- Warren Ellis – violin, organ
- Jim White – drums
- Mark C Halstead – backing vocals

=== Tracks 2-5 ===
- Rob Snarski – vocals, acoustic guitar
- Phil Kakulas – double bass
- Graham Lee – pedal steel, backing vocals, electric guitars, lead vocals on track 3

Recorded by Andy Parsons at Fortissimo Studios, Melbourne, late 1993
