= Anchor Me =

Anchor Me may refer to:

- "Anchor Me" (EP), by The Blackeyed Susans, or the title song
- "Anchor Me" (song), a 1994 single by The Mutton Birds
- Anchor Me (film), a 2000 television film starring Annette Crosbie
