= Mary Mack (disambiguation) =

Mary Mack is a clapping game played by children.

Mary Mack may also refer to:

- Mary Mack (comedian) (born 1975), American folk humorist
- Mary Bono Mack (born 1961), American politician
- "Mary Mack" (folk song), a Scottish folk song

== See also ==
- "Mary Mac", a 1996 song by the Blackeyed Susans
