= Murfin =

Murfin is a surname. Notable people with the surname include:

- Jane Murfin (1884–1955), American playwright and screenwriter
- Orin G. Murfin (1876–1956), United States Navy admiral

== See also ==
- Murdin
- Murfin Music International, British radio broadcasting company
