= Anchor Me (EP) =

EP by The Blackeyed Susans
- Released: August 1991
- Recorded: 1991; Sydney, Australia
- Genre: Rock / Folk rock
- Length: 15:46
- Label: Waterfront Records
- Producer: Phillip Kakulas and The Blackeyed Susans

The Blackeyed Susans chronology
Some Births are Worse than Murders (1989)	Anchor Me (1991)	Depends on What You Mean by Love (1991)

Anchor Me is an EP by The Blackeyed Susans, released in August 1991 on Waterfront Records.

== Background ==
In late 1990 following Rob Snarski's return from London, he established a new line-up of the band, comprising Kenny Davis Jr. (The Jackson Code - keyboards), Phil Kakulas (Martha's Vineyard - bass), Kathryn Wemyss (The Jackson Code - vocals, trumpet), Tim Rollinson (Directions in Groove - guitar), James Elliott (The Cruel Sea - drums) and James Cruickshank (The Cruel Sea - organ). This line-up recorded Anchor Me in early 1991, with the song "Glory Glory" being included on the Triple J Live at the Wireless compilation album. The songs were subsequently included on the band's 16-track debut album Welcome Stranger, released in August 1992.

== Track listing ==
1. "Glory Glory" (Kakulas) – 4:47
2. "Anchor Me" (Snarski) – 4:03
3. "Who's That By The Window?" (Kakulas) – 2:43
4. "Trouble" (Kakulas/Rollinson) – 4:13

== Personnel ==
- Rob Snarski – vocals, acoustic guitar
- Kathryn Wemyss – vocals, trumpet, castanets
- Phillip Kakulas – double bass
- Kenny Davis Junior – piano, piano accordion
- James Cruikshank – organ
- Graham Lee – pedal steel
- Mark Dawson – percussion
- Tim Rollinson – electric guitar
