= Murin (surname) =

Murin is a Slavic male surname, with its feminine counterpart as Murina. Notable people with the surname include:

- Gigi Murin, American VTuber
- Gustáv Murín (born 1959), Slovak journalist
- Michal Murin (born 1963), Slovak artist
- Ondřej Murín (born 1991), Czech association football defender
- Patti Murin (born 1980), American actress
