= Some Night, Somewhere =

Live album by The Blackeyed Susans
- Released: December 1996
- Recorded: Continental Café; Melbourne, Easter 1996
- Genre: Rock / Folk rock
- Length: 37:10
- Label: Hi Gloss Records

The Blackeyed Susans chronology
Mouth to Mouth (1995)	Some Night, Somewhere (1996)	Spin The Bottle (1997)

Some Night, Somewhere is a live album by The Blackeyed Susans, given away with copies of Mouth To Mouth sold around December, 1996 as a Christmas bonus disc. It was recorded live at the Continental Café in Melbourne and was a limited edition CD.

== Track listing ==
All songs written by Phil Kakulas, except where noted.

1. "Sheets Of Rain" – 4:35
2. "Let’s Live" (Phil Kakulas, Rob Snarski) – 5:15
3. "Mary Mac" – 3:51
4. "I Can’t Find Your Pulse" (Rob Snarski, Phil Kakulas) – 5:28
5. "I Need You" (Rob Snarski) – 3:48
6. "Glory, Glory" – 4:52
7. "She Breathes In (She Breathes Out)" (Phil Kakulas, Rob Snarski) – 5:19
8. "A Curse On You" (Phil Kakulas, David McComb, Graham Lee) – 3:58

== Personnel ==
- Rob Snarski – vocals, guitars
- Phil Kakulas – bass
- Kiernan Box – organ, piano
- Dan Luscombe – guitar, backing vocals
- Mark Dawson – drums
- Kathy Wemyss – trumpet, backing vocals on track 6
