= Zen Group of Western Australia =

Religion
- Affiliation: Diamond Sangha, Zen

Location
- Location: Fremantle, Western Australia
- Country: Australia

Architecture
- Founder: Robert Aitken Roshi
- Completed: 1983

Website
- www.zgwa.org.au

The Zen Group of Western Australia (ZGWA) is an organization of lay zen practitioners located in Perth, Western Australia.

== Affiliation and practice ==
The ZGWA is formally affiliated with the Diamond Sangha tradition of Zen Buddhism, which was founded in Hawaii in 1959 by Robert Aitken Roshi.

In keeping with Diamond Sangha tradition, the ZGWA uses rituals from both the Soto and Rinzai schools. Mediation practices of Shikantaza from the Sōtō school and koan training from the Rinzai school are typical forms of practise employed by students in the group, under the guidance of the groups roshi.

== Teachers ==
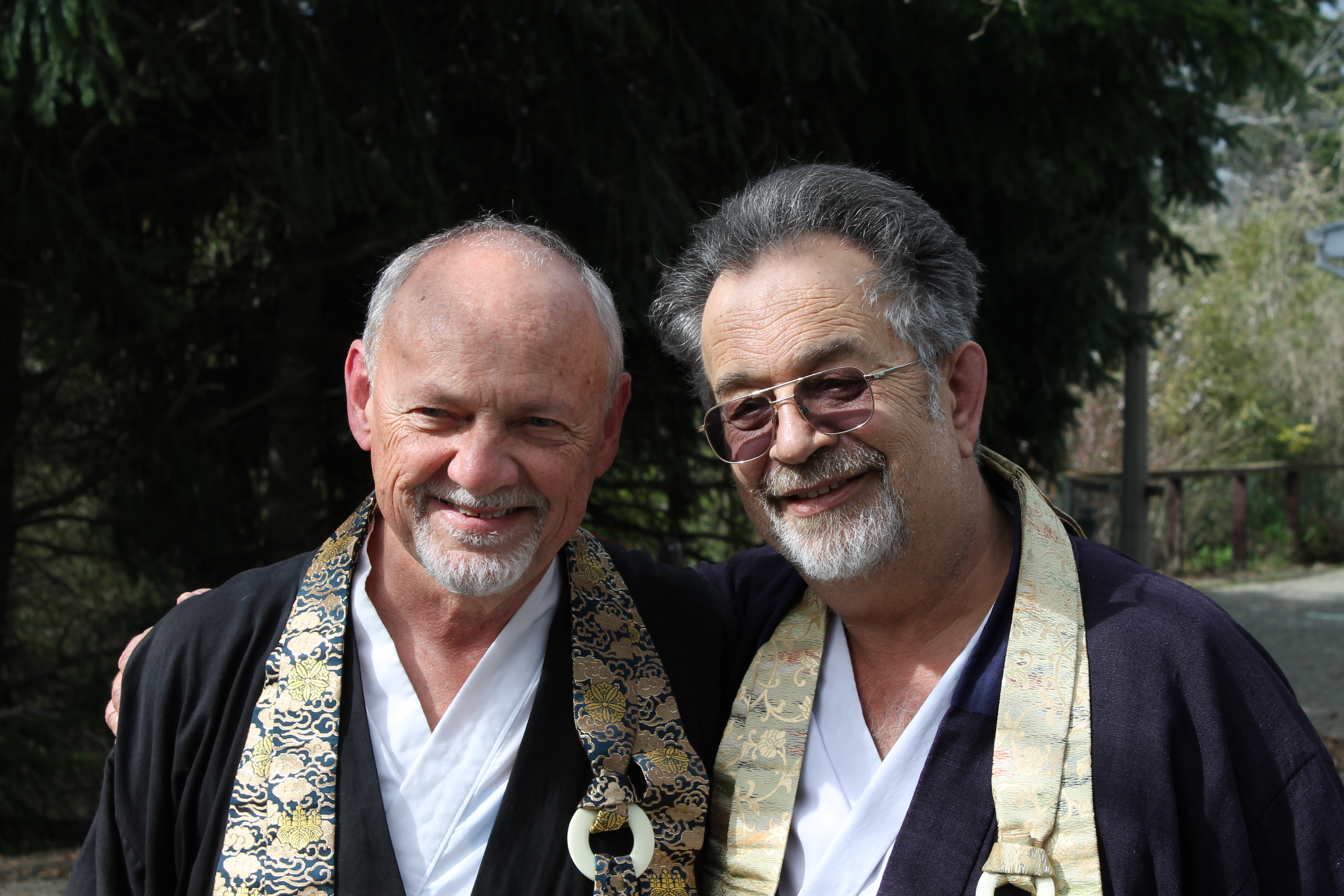
Ross Bolleter (right) after the transmission ceremony for Arthur Wells

ZGWA's senior teacher is Ross Bolleter Roshi, who supervises new Zen teachers and assists with the founding of new groups throughout Australia and New Zealand. Ross Bolleter Roshi received transmission from Robert Aitken Roshi in 1995. Ian Sweetman Roshi is the resident teacher in Perth, authorized in 2001 by Ross Bolleter Roshi.

== Organization ==
The group is a not-for-profit organization, assisted by an annually elected council of volunteer members. Council responsibilities include the organizing of sesshin and weekly zazen, correspondence to members about events and assisting with orientation for newcomers.

The ZGWA has no proprietary residence. Appropriate housing of the zendo is made by rental arrangement.

== History ==
The ZGWA started in 1983 with a small group of people sitting in a private home in Mt. Claremont, Perth. Over the years, the ZGWA's meeting place zendo has moved from private residences to an office building in Fremantle, and is currently situated at a church hall.

== See also ==
- Sanbo Kyodan
