= Let's Live =

Single by The Blackeyed Susans

from the album Mouth to Mouth
- Released: June 1995
- Recorded: Autumn 1995; Fortissimo Sound Studios; South Melbourne
- Genre: Rock, folk rock
- Length: 15:06
- Label: Hi Gloss Records/MDS
- Songwriter: Phil Kakulas / Rob Snarski
- Producers: Phil Kakulas (with the assistance of Rob Snarski; Victor Van Vugt; Andy Parsons; Tony Cohen)

The Blackeyed Susans singles chronology
"This One Eats Souls" (1994)	"Let's Live" (1995)	"Mary Mac" (1996)

"Let's Live" is a single by The Blackeyed Susans, released in June 1995. It was the first single taken from the band's third studio album, Mouth to Mouth. It included several bonus tracks which were not available on the album, the most notable of which was a Suicide-styled re-working of the Bruce Springsteen track "State Trooper".

In Ned Raggett's (Allmusic) review he felt "The late-night-in-the-club feeling of "Let's Live" benefits from the sometimes campy string performance." In David Landgren's review he states ""Let's Live" is a slower number, replete with violins and cello, and I think it is this track that makes you realise that Blackeyed Susans are not just clones of what the aforementioned bands (Died Pretty and The Cruel Sea), but are very clearly tracing out their own path."

The song was featured in the second season of the Australian television drama series, Secret Life of Us.

== Track listing ==
Let's Live
No.	Title	Writer(s)	Length
1.	"Let's Live"	Phil Kakulas, Rob Snarski	4:08
2.	"State Trooper"	Bruce Springsteen	4:14
3.	"Moody River"	Gary Bruce	3:20
4.	"You're My Flaw"	Phil Kakulas	3:24

== Personnel ==
=== Tracks 1–3 ===
- Rob Snarski - vocals, guitars
- Phil Kakulas - double bass
- Kiernan Box - piano, organ
- Ashley Davies - drum kit on track 1
- Jen Anderson - violins on track 1
- Helen Mountfort - cello on track 1
- Mark C Halstead - backing vocals on track 1
- Kathryn Wemyss - string arrangement on track 1

=== Track 4 ===
- Phil Kakulas
- Tim and Jon (the two blind boys of Bruce Street) - backing vocals

== Other credits ==
1. Produced by Phil Kakulas, recorded by Victor van Vugt and Andy Parsons, mixed by Tony Cohen.
2. For Alan Vega & Martin Rev. Produced by Phil Kakulas, recorded and mixed by Andy Parsons.
3. Produced by the Blackeyed Susans, recorded by Andy Parsons, mixed by Tony Cohen.
4. Some LC "stranger music" returned with thanks. Performed and recorded by Phil Kakulas in a Stanmore bedroom, Sydney 1990. Vocal recorded by Julian Wu.
