= Smokin' Johnny Cash =

Single by The Blackeyed Susans

from the album Spin the Bottle
- A-side: "Smokin' Johnny Cash"
- Released: May 1997
- Recorded: Sing Sing and Fortissimo Studios, Melbourne; Summer, 1996–1997
- Genre: Rock, folk rock
- Length: 16:03
- Label: Hi Gloss Records
- Songwriter(s): Phil Kakulas, Rob Snarski, Mark Dawson
- Producer(s): Victor Van Vugt; Phil Kakulas

The Blackeyed Susans singles chronology
"Mary Mac" (1996)	"Smokin' Johnny Cash" (1997)	"Spin the Wheel" (1997)

"Smokin' Johnny Cash" is a single by The Blackeyed Susans, released in May 1997. It was the first single lifted from the band's album, Spin the Bottle.

The song reached #86 on Triple J's Hottest 100 in 1997 and was featured in the Australian television drama series The Secret Life of Us (Episode 3 Second Series).

The video for the song was also aired on the national Australian music video program, rage, in July 2002.

== Track listing ==
1. Smokin' Johnny Cash (Kakulas/Snarski/Dawson) – 3:40
2. You Rule Me (Snarski/Kakulas) – 4:15
3. Out of Our Skins (Kakulas/Jennings) – 2:50
4. Take Me Down (Kakulas/Snarski) – 5:18

== Personnel ==
=== Track 1-2 ===
- Rob Snarski – vocals, guitars, whistling
- Phil Kakulas – bass, omnichord
- Kiernan Box – piano, organ, harmonium, string arrangement
- Dan Luscombe – guitars, optigan, vocals
- Mark Dawson – drums, percussion
- Jen Anderson – violin
- Suzanne Simpson -violin
- Deirdre Dowling – viola
- Helen Mountfort – cello
- Matthew Habben – saxophone
- Ken Gardner – trumpet
- Adam Hutterer – trombone
- Mark C Halstead – backing vocals
- Graham Lee – backing vocals
- Lisa Miller – backing vocals
- Jodie Meehan – backing vocals
- Kelly Nash – backing vocals

=== Track 3 ===
- Phil Kakulas
- Gary Jennings

=== Track 4 ===
- Phil Kakulas
- Rob Snarski
- Graham Lee
- Mark C Halstead

== Other credits ==
1. Produced by Victor van Vugt and Phil Kakulas. Recorded by and mixed by Victor Van Vugt.
2. Produced by Victor van Vugt and Phil Kakulas. Recorded by and mixed by Victor Van Vugt.
3. Recorded by Phil Kakulas in a bedroom in Nedlands, Perth, long ago. Played by P.K. and Gary Jennings.
4. Recorded by Phil Kakulas on an 8-track in a spare room in Abbotsford, Melbourne 1992. Mixed by PK & Julian Wu.

== Charts ==
Chart (1997)	Peak position
Australia (ARIA)	145
