= Shangri-La (The Blackeyed Susans album) =

Studio album by The Blackeyed Susans
- Released: July 21, 2003
- Recorded: Sing-Sing Studios, Melbourne (2002)
- Genre: Rock / Folk rock
- Length: 56:14
- Label: Teardrop
- Producers: Phil Kakulas, Craig Pilkington; The Blackeyed Susans

The Blackeyed Susans chronology
Dedicated to the Ones We Love (2001)	Shangri-La (2003)	Close Your Eyes And See (2017)

Professional ratings
Review scores
Source	Rating
Oz Music Project	

Shangri-La is the sixth studio album by The Blackeyed Susans, released in July 2003. After initial writing sessions in mid-1999, recording of the album was scheduled for 2000. It was postponed when the band’s then record company, Mds, was bought by Festival Records. The band eventually returned to the project in 2002, after their covers album Dedicated to the Ones We Love. It was released on their own label, Teardrop, the following year.

The title of the album Shangri-La, refers to an illusory island paradise, a lost utopia that exists only in imagination and metaphor an apt name considering it was almost abandoned as an impossible project. In an interview Phil Kakulas commented

"It was named before, back when I still had all faith that it would be released," Kakulas begins, "but it seems almost prophetic in that we did almost lose it. The name 'Shangri-La' seems to sum up a lot of what the album is about. The songs seem to deal with what happiness might be and where you might find happiness. Also I've been listening to a lot of the Shangri-Las, the girl group, and I like that seedy neon lights appeal. My vision of Shangri-La is much more like Vegas or something like that. It's a fools paradise."

Shangri-La was nominated for 'Best Adult Contemporary Album' at the 2003 ARIA Awards, missing out to John Farnham's The Last Time.

== Track listing ==
All songs written by Phil Kakulas and Rob Snarski, except where noted.

1. "A Cat Needs A Mouse" (Phil Kakulas, Dan Luscombe, Rob Snarski) – 3:15
2. "End Of Time" – 5:04
3. "Open All Hours" (Kiernan Box, Phil Kakulas, Dan Luscombe) – 4:47
4. "My Body (Has A Mind Of Its Own)" (Kiernan Box, Phil Kakulas, Dan Luscombe) – 3:27
5. "Deliver Me" – 5:26
6. "Lost Horizon" (Kiernan Box, Phil Kakulas, Dan Luscombe, Rob Snarski) – 4:43
7. "Hard Stuff" (Phil Kakulas, Dan Luscombe, Smith) – 3:48
8. "The Eastern States" (Phil Kakulas, Dan Luscombe) – 5:52
9. "Shangri-La" (Kiernan Box, Phil Kakulas) – 3:27
10. "It’s Gonna Rain" – 5:34
11. "Indian Summer" (Kiernan Box, Matt Habben) – 2:57
12. "Endless Night" (Mark Dawson, Phil Kakulas, Rob Snarski) – 7:50

== Personnel ==
=== Blackeyed Susans ===
- Mark Dawson
- Phil Kakulas
- Kiernan Box
- Dan Luscombe
- Rob Snarski

=== Additional musicians ===
- Matt Habben – clarinet, saxophone
- Adam Hutterer – trombone
- Craig Pilkington – trumpet
- Jen Anderson – violin, viola
- Helen Mountford – cello
