= The Blackeyed Susans =

Australian rock band

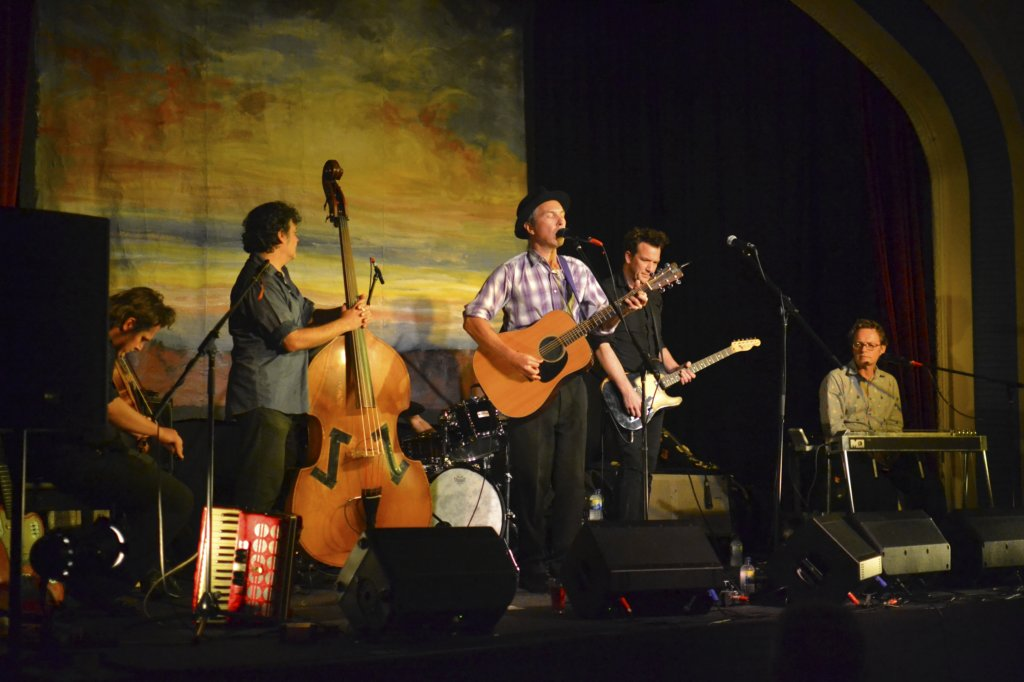
- The Blackeyed Susans performing at the Caravan Music Club

Background information
- Also known as: The Bottomless Schooners of Old; the Blackeyed Susans Trio
- Origin: Perth, Western Australia, Australia
- Genre: Rock
- Years active: 1989–present
- Labels: Waterfront; Torn & Frayed/Shock; Frontier; Hi Gloss/MDS; American
- Members: Phil Kakulas; Rob Snarski; Dan Luscombe; Kiernan Box; Mark Dawson; Jonathan Paul "J.P." Shilo
- Past members: see Past members
- Website: blackeyedsusans.com.au

For the American band with a similar name, see Blackeyed Susan.

The Blackeyed Susans are an Australian rock band, which formed in Perth in 1989. Long-serving members are Phil Kakulas on bass guitar, guitar and vocals; and Rob Snarski on vocals and guitar. They have released seven studio albums: Welcome Stranger (August 1992), All Souls Alive (December 1993), Mouth to Mouth (July 1995), Spin the Bottle (July 1997), Dedicated to the Ones We Love (23 April 2001), Shangri-La (21 July 2003) and Close Your Eyes and See (3 March 2017).

== Perth: 1989–1990 ==
The original line-up of the Blackeyed Susans consisted of Ross Bolleter on organ and accordion, Phil Kakulas on bass guitar, guitar and vocals (from Martha's Vineyard and ex–the Triffids), Alsy MacDonald on drums, David McComb on vocals and guitar (both from the Triffids), and Rob Snarski (ex–Chad's Tree) on vocals and guitar. Initially, they were formed as the Bottomless Schooners of Old in late 1988 in Perth as a side project and loose collective to perform cover versions of "countrified alternative rock" music. Early in the next year, they adopted their name from the Triffids track "Blackeyed Susan", which is on that group's fifth studio album, The Black Swan (April 1989); the track was co-written by Kakulas and McComb.

They played eight gigs and recorded four songs before their main bands' reactivations forced them to put the project on hold. The tracks became their first extended play, Some Births Are Worse than Murders, which was released in 1990 on Waterfront Records. The group had used Perth's Planet Sound Studios in March 1989, with the band members co-producing alongside James Hewgill. A music video was released for the second track, "Enemy Mine". The record spent several weeks at number one on the independent charts in Australia.

By the time the EP was released the band's membership underwent several changes. Not everyone took their holidays at the same time, so a floating line-up became part of the band's character and appeal. Kakulas left for Sydney with Martha's Vineyard. He was replaced by Martyn Casey (the Triffids). Bolleter relocated to Japan, where he played piano in cocktail bars and restaurants. He was replaced by Adrian Wood. McComb was present in the second line-up in 1989 before departing for England. He was replaced by Kim Salmon (ex-the Scientists, Beasts of Bourbon, Kim Salmon and the Surrealists) on guitar and vocals in the summer of 1990. Casey departed shortly after to join Nick Cave and the Bad Seeds.

== Sydney: 1990–1991 ==
In mid-1990, Snarski travelled to London and recorded an album's worth of material with McComb and Kenny Davis Jnr (of the Jackson Code) on keyboards. Upon returning to Australia, Snarski moved to Sydney and, with Davis aboard, formed the next line-up of the Blackeyed Susans. Soon after Kakulas rejoined, having worked with Grant McLennan (ex-the Go-Betweens) after the demise of Martha's Vineyard, six months earlier. Kathy Wemyss (of the Jackson Code) on vocals and trumpet, and Tim Rollinson (of DIG) on guitar, were recruited whilst on hiatus from their inner city cabaret band, Pressed Meat and the Smallgoods. James Elliott on drums and James Cruickshank on organ took leave from the Cruel Sea to play in the band.

This line-up remained intact for most of 1991 and, in March, they recorded another four-track EP, Anchor Me (August 1991). It had been recorded at Electric Avenue Studios, Sydney and was co-produced by Kakulas and the band. They also contributed a live version of the EP's song, "Glory, Glory", from a broadcast on the national youth radio station, Triple J programme, Live at the Wireless, on the related compilation album, Live at the Wireless 2 (1991).

Despite playing shows in Sydney and Melbourne, the Blackeyed Susans were still an occasional ensemble, coming together when it suited them for the pleasure of playing. They created a backdrop for Snarski's honey-laden vocals, which were gaining more attention from press and public alike. At the West Australian Music Industry Awards he was awarded Best Male Vocalist in 1991.

In late 1991 four tracks from "the London Sessions", with the line-up of Davis, McComb, Snarski and Joanne Alach on backing vocals, were released as the group's third EP, ...Depends on What You Mean by Love, which was produced by McComb.

== Melbourne: 1992–present ==
The Blackeyed Susans reassembled in Melbourne early in 1992, where Kakulas and Snarski had relocated. McComb returned to Australia after releasing two solo singles and playing a few shows in London with his band the Red Ponies; he settled in Melbourne and rejoined the group. Former Sydney resident, Graham Lee (ex-the Triffids, Dave Graney and the White Buffaloes), joined on guitar, pedal steel guitar, lap-steel guitar and backing vocals. While living in Melbourne, Lee had been a member of the Paradise Vendors (1990–91), the Pub Dogs (1991), and Crown of Thorns (1991).

Two locals, Warren Ellis (ex-These Future Kings) on violin, organ and piano accordion, and Jim White (ex-Venom P Stinger, Conway Savage and the Deep South) on drums completed the line-up. Ellis and White also formed their own band, Dirty Three, with Mick Turner in 1992. A compilation CD, Welcome Stranger, was released via Waterfront Records in August of that year. It incorporated all twelve tracks from their three EPs plus two extra tracks from "the London Sessions" and a live version of a Triffids' song, "In the Pines" (from their 1986 album of the same name).

The line-up of Ellis, Lee, Kakulas, McComb, Snarski and White toured to promote Welcome Stranger before recording their debut studio album, All Souls Alive, in July 1993 at Fortissimo Studios, Melbourne with Kakulas producing. It was released in December via Torn & Frayed Records/Shock Records. Its lead track, "A Curse on You", was described by Australian musicologist, Ian McFarlane, as "a piece of gothic high-drama-set-in-song that recalled a William Faulkner novel."

All Souls Alive has ten tracks, four co-written by Kakulas and McComb, a cover version of Leonard Cohen and Phil Spector's "Memories" (from Cohen's album, Death of a Ladies' Man, November 1977) and a version of Johnny Paycheck's song, "Apartment No. 9" (1966). Nine tracks had lead vocals by Snarski and one by McComb, the album showed the inspired chaos of Ellis and the majesty of White, pedal steel by Lee and mandolin and harmony vocals by Mark C. Halstead (ex-the Paradise Vendors, the Disappointments).

After supporting American alternate rockers, Concrete Blonde, for a gig in Adelaide, Snarski spoke to Nicole Leedham of The Canberra Times in December 1993, "It was an odd choice but it was good exposure for us... Although our influence's are quite different from theirs, we do share a love of Leonard Cohen." He went on to describe his group's other influences, "Graham [Lee] is immersed in country music and Phil's favourite album at the moment is a record of the uterus and a baby's heartbeat set against classical music, "Dave [McKone [sic]] and Graham are also ex-members of the Triffids, so they like that music and people tend to put Warren [Ellis] and Jim [White] in the jazz category – which I don't really understand." Leedham felt the album was "full of hard-luck tales... It is a tribute to the downtrodden, the lovelorn, the suicidal... which, after just one listen, make the world seem a much sadder place. It would have been nice if they'd included just one positive song."

During 1993, McComb left the group to return to the Red Ponies, while Ellis and White resumed their work with Dirty Three. Meanwhile Lee, Kakulas and Snarski toured as the Blackeyed Susans Trio. Kakulas explained the offshoot, "We use it as something to do when the Susans aren't playing... It gives us the opportunity to strip down the music. We have fun with it, delving into the Susans' back catalogue more than the full band does. We also work on new material through the trio. The acoustic set is also such a great vehicle for Rob's voice. The audience gets to listen to the voices more than is possible when the band's making a racket."

All Souls Alive was released in the United States on Frontier Records in April 1994 receiving positive reviews: Ned Raggett of AllMusic opined that Snarski's "combination of rock forcefulness and just-twangy-enough brooding also suit the lyrics, courtesy mostly of Kakulas and McComb, quite well. Images of emptiness, forlorn hope, romantic bitterness, and religious iconography litter the songs, but rather than amping things up á la countryman Nick Cave, the Susans coat everything with just enough honey in the arrangements." It was also released in Europe in July 1994. The album was reviewed in the UK press and received airplay on Radio One.

Two singles were lifted off the album, both in July 1994, "Dirty Water" and "This One Eats Souls". Each included four bonus tracks from a cassette-only album, Hard Liquor, Soft Music (March 1994) by the Blackeyed Susans Trio. The cassette was sold at their gigs as an album's worth of late-night melancholy that has since become a sought-after rarity.

The Blackeyed Susans commenced working on their third album, Mouth to Mouth, in August 1994. For recording the line-up of Lee, Kakulas and Snarski, they were joined by Jen Anderson (ex–Black Sorrows) on violin, Kiernan Box on piano, organ and harmonica, Ashley Davies (ex–White Cross, Wild Pumpkins at Midnight) on drums, Dan Luscombe on guitars, Helen Mountfort on cello and Wemyss on trumpet and string arrangements. It was recorded at Fortissimo Sound Studios, with production by Kakulas, Snarski, Victor Van Vugt, Andy Parsons and Tony Cohen. The album was released in mid-July 1995 via Hi Gloss/MDS.

"Let’s Live", the first single from Mouth to Mouth, was released in June 1995. It contained several bonus tracks not available on the album, including a Suicide-styled reworking of the Bruce Springsteen track "State Trooper". "Mary Mac" (September) was the album's second single, again with bonus tracks not previously available, including a version of the Go-Betweens track "Dive for Your Memory". It is the band's most successful thus far and an essential part of their set list.

After recording the album, the line-up of Box, Luscombe, Kakulas, and Snarski were joined by a new drummer, Mark Dawson (ex–John Kennedy's Love Gone Wrong, Ed Kuepper Band). They toured nationally from late in 1994 and throughout 1995, and ended the year with a tribute show to Elvis Presley on New Year's Eve. This became an annual event: they returned to The Corner Hotel, Melbourne, to play the best and the worst of the Presley's back catalogue each year, concluding in 1998.

A national tour supporting Australian musician Paul Kelly occurred in 1996. They signed with American Recordings, which issued Mouth to Mouth in May for the North American market. The band travelled to New York to play with Johnny Cash, at CMJ in September, before touring the US and Canada. In December, a live extended play, Some Night, Somewhere, was released, and it was also included as a Christmas bonus disc for an expanded version of Mouth to Mouth. It provides eight tracks from a gig at the Continental Café, Melbourne, in Easter of that year. The relationship with American Recordings was short-lived: the label dropped the group from their roster, along with most of their other international acts, in 1997.

During 1997, the band recorded their fourth studio album, Spin the Bottle, which was released in July via Hi Gloss. It was co-produced by Kakulas and Van Vugt, with ten new songs and a cover version of Billie Holiday's "You're My Thrill". The lead single, "Smokin' Johnny Cash", was issued ahead of the album in May. It was listed on the Triple J Hottest 100, 1997. On 9 July 1997, they performed on the RMITV show Under Melbourne Tonight, "Episode 5".

Spin the Bottle provided two more singles, "Spin the Wheel" (September 1997) and "Blue Skies, Blue Sea" (February 1998). A busy touring schedule saw the Blackeyed Susans occupied for almost a year, concluding in March 1998 with a national tour with the Whitlams. The album was nominated for Best Independent Release at the ARIA Music Awards of 1998.

The group's members turned to other projects, including the W Minc Productions' various artists' compilation album, Where Joy Kills Sorrow (1997), which was produced by Lee and included Dawson and Kakulas playing on several tracks, Snarski collaborated with Matt Walker on "If You Don't Want My Love". Box' band, the Disappointments, released an album, Wet Your Beak, which included Halstead on vocals.

After a respite, the Blackeyed Susans reconvened in August 1998 to record another EP, La Mascara, which was released in November. According to McFarlane, "In keeping with the theme of Mexican masked wrestlers, the band was billed on cover as 'las Blackeyed Susans'." Its five tracks include "Oh Yeah, Oh Yeah, Oh No" and "To Skin a Man". Both received airplay on Triple J and other Australian youth-orientated stations. A video for "To Skin a Man" was commissioned: it was produced and directed by Adam Kyle and Holly Shorland, depicting images of flesh and blood which were too much for the Australian Broadcasting Corporation (ABC), where it was screened only in black and white. A tour ensued through the summer and well into 1999.

In February 1999, their co-founder, David McComb, died at his Northcote home. In the 1990s, his ill health resulted in a heart transplant in 1995. From May to July 1999, the Blackeyed Susans prepared thirteen songs on a four-track machine in the living room of Snarski's flat. Their proposed album, Shangri-La, was due to be recorded and released in the next year. However, in May 2000, the group left their record company, MDS, after it was bought out by Festival Records; consequently, Shangri-La was delayed until July 2003.

In April 2001, the group issued a new album, Dedicated to the Ones We Love, on their own label, Teardrop Records, which was distributed through Shock Records. It was co-produced by Lee and the group. The record was a tribute to the influences and aspirations of the band – including songs from Elvis Presley, Frank Sinatra, Big Star, and the Velvet Underground. It was well received by the public and lauded by critics, a national tour followed until the end of the year. Undercover News's Hector the Rock Dog felt the album was full "of covers and not really aiming at any particular era. This one is full of wild cards... Nearly ever song is an obscure cover, highlighting the song over the original artist."

Early in 2002, the band members resumed solo and side projects. Luscombe and Snarski released an album, There Is Nothing Here That Belongs to You, later that year on the Quietly Suburban label. The duo followed with national tours supporting Marianne Faithfull and then Paul Kelly. The Blackeyed Susans returned to Sing-Sing Studios in Richmond late in 2002 to finally record Shangri-La. They augmented their sound with op-shop instruments and old vinyl – it was finally released 21 July 2003 on Teardrop Records/Shock Records.

Shangri-La was nominated for Best Adult Contemporary Album at the ARIA Music Awards of 2003, missing out to John Farnham's The Last Time. After its release, they played sporadically. Luscombe and Box perform with other artists but are still band members and continue to play with them when possible. In 2001, Box joined Augie March, while Luscombe joined Paul Kelly's backing band in 2003, then the Drones in 2006.

A four-disc retrospective box set, Reveal Yourself, was released on 30 October 2009.

On 3 March 2017, the group issued their seventh studio album, Close Your Eyes and See, via Teardrop Records. They announced an associated tour for April to July to promote the album. Graham Blackley of Beat magazine opined that "On this enticing album, which was elegantly produced by Dan Luscombe, the band create a richly textured sound that embraces light and shade while managing to be both atmospheric and memorably melodic... [it] is the assured work of a confident and inspired band still at the top of their game."

== Members ==
=== Current members ===
- Phil Kakulas – double bass, bass guitar, bazouki, vocals, guitar, percussion (1989, 1991–present)
- Rob Snarski – lead vocals, guitar (1989–present)
- Dan Luscombe – guitar (1994–present)
- Kiernan Box – piano, organ, harmonica (1994–present)
- Mark Dawson – drums, percussion (1995–present)
- Jonathan Paul "J.P." Shilo – guitar, accordion, violin (2005–present)

=== Past members ===
- Ross Bolleter – hammond organ, accordion (1989)
- Alsy MacDonald – drums, percussion (1989–90)
- David McComb – lead vocals, guitar, percussion, bass guitar, keyboards (1989–90, 1992–93, died 1999)
- Will Akers – backing vocals, percussion (1989)
- Martyn P. Casey – bass guitar (1990)
- Kim Salmon – guitar (1990)
- Adrian Wood – keyboards (1990)
- James Cruickshank – organ (1991)
- Kenny Davis Jr. – keyboards, piano accordina, samples (1991)
- James Elliott – drums (1991)
- Tim Rollinson – guitar (1991)
- Kathy Wemyss – vocals, trumpet (1991)
- Ashley Davies – drums (1994)
- Warren Ellis – violin, organ, piano accordion (1992–93)
- Graham Lee – guitar, lap-steel guitar, backing vocals, pedal steel, vocals (1992–93)
- Jim White – drums (1992–93)
- Mark C. Halstead – mandolin, backing vocals (1993–94)
- Matthew Habben – clarinet, saxophone (2001–05)

== Discography ==
- Welcome Stranger (1992)
- All Souls Alive (1993)
- Hard Liquor, Soft Music (1994)
- Mouth To Mouth (1995)
- Spin The Bottle (1997)
- Dedicated To The Ones We Love (2001)
- Shangri-La (2003)
- Close Your Eyes And See (2017)

== Awards and nominations ==
=== ARIA Music Awards ===
The ARIA Music Awards are a set of annual ceremonies presented by Australian Recording Industry Association (ARIA), which recognise excellence, innovation, and achievement across all genres of the music of Australia. They commenced in 1987.

Year	Nominee / work	Award	Result	Ref.
1998	Spin the Bottle	Independent Release	Nominated	
