= John Exton (composer) =

Australian composer

John Albert Exton (28 March 1933 – 13 September 2009) was a British composer of classical music.

John Exton was born in Wolverton, and started to play the violin at the age of 11. In 1950 he became leader of the National Youth Orchestra of Great Britain. He started to read music at the King's College in Cambridge. In 1956 he won the Mendelssohn Scholarship and studied with Luigi Dallapiccola in Florence for a year. After that he continued his studies in Cambridge with Robin Orr and Matyas Seiber. He became Doctor in Music in 1963 and in the same year the director of music at Bedales School.

In 1966 John Exton followed an appointment as a senior lecturer at the University of Western Australia in Perth. He taught composition there until his retirement. Notable students of John Exton include Carl Vine, Jennifer Fowler, Ross Bolleter or Stephen Benfall. He died in Perth, aged 76.

== Compositions ==
- 3 pieces, for oboe: I: Prelude, II: Siciliana, III: Ostinato (1955, rev. 1961)
- Dialogues, for 2 violins (1957)
- Partita for string quartet (1957)
- 3 simple pieces, for piano (1961)
- 6 caprices, for violin (1961)
- String trio (1961)
- Variations for piano (1961)
- Concertante for piano and five instruments (1961)
- Fantasy for violin and piano (1961)
- String quartet No.2 (1961)
- Movements for orchestra (1964)
- The story of Christ's nativity according to St. Luke, for narrators, singers and instruments (1965)
- 2 Psalms and a Homily, for choir and organ (1966)
- Wind quintet (1967)
- String quartet No.3 (1969)
- Breathing space, electro-acoustic work (1972)
- String quartet No.4 with electronics (1972)
- String quartet No.5 (1972)
- Ryoanji, for 40 strings and percussion (1973)
- String quartet No.6 (1974)
- Give or take a few db, for piano (1975)
- String quartet No.7 (1975)
- Cantio obliqua, for violin (1993)
- 3 pieces for organ "Contrapuncti“
- In memoriam Joseph Haydn, for baritone and string quartet
