= Some Births Are Worse than Murders =

Some Births Are Worse Than Murders

EP by The Blackeyed Susans
- Released: March 1989
- Recorded: Perth; 1989
- Genre: Rock / Folk rock
- Length: 17:18
- Label: Waterfront Records
- Producer: James Hewgill; The Blackeyed Susans

The Blackeyed Susans chronology
Some Births Are Worse Than Murders (1989)	Anchor Me (1991)

Some Births Are Worse Than Murders is the debut EP by The Blackeyed Susans, released in March 1989 on Waterfront Records.

The Blackeyed Susans was formed in Perth in 1989 as a side project for Martha's Vineyard, Chad's Tree and the Triffids members, including David McComb. They played eight gigs and recorded four songs before their "day jobs" forced them to put the project on hold. The songs became Some Births are Worse than Murders. The EP was acclaimed by music critics nationally and in the UK, the record spent several weeks at No. l on the independent charts in Australia.

== Track listing ==
1. "Don’t Call Yourself An Angel" (David McComb, Phil Kakulas) – 3:14
2. "Enemy Mine" (David McComb, Phil Kakulas) – 4:07
3. "Viva Las Vegas" (Doc Pomus, Mort Shuman) – 5:10
4. "Cripple Creek" (Traditional/Phil Kakulas) – 4:47

== Personnel ==
=== Blackeyed Susans ===
- David McComb – vocals, guitar, percussion
- Rob Snarski – vocals, guitar
- Phil Kakulas – double bass, electric bass, bazouki, guitar, backing vocals, percussion
- Alsy MacDonald – drums, percussion
- Ross Bolleter – hammond organ, piano, piano organ

=== Additional musicians ===
- William Akers – backing vocals
