= La Mascara (EP) =

EP by The Blackeyed Susans
- Released: November 1998
- Recorded: August 1988
- Studio: Sing Sing Studios, Melbourne
- Genre: Rock/Folk rock
- Length: 17:53
- Label: Hi-Gloss Records
- Producer: Victor Van Vugt; The Blackeyed Susans

The Blackeyed Susans chronology
Spin The Bottle (1997)	La Mascara (1998)	Dedicated To The Ones We Love (2001)

La Mascara is an EP by The Blackeyed Susans released in November 1998. It peaked at No. 5 on the AIR Charts in November 1988 and No. 6 on the Australian Music Report's Alternative Singles/EP chart. Las Mascara was nominated for 'Best Single/EP (Independent)' at the 1999 Music Industry Critics Awards.

A video for "To Skin a Man" was produced and directed by Adam Kyle and Holly Shorland. The song was featured in the first season of the Australian television drama series, The Secret Life of Us.

== Track listing ==
1. "To Skin a Man" (Kakulas, Snarski, Box) – 3:53
2. "Oh Yeah, Oh Yeah, Oh No" (The Blackeyed Susans) – 3:01
3. "Come Ride With Me" (Snarski, Blair, Luscombe) – 4:07
4. "No Direction Home" (Snarski, Luscombe, Dawson) – 3:09
5. "Be My Medicine" (Snarski, Kakulas) – 3:39

== Personnel ==
- Roberto Snarski – Vocals, acoustic guitar, electric guitar voz y guitarras acusticas y electricas
- Daniel Luscombe – Electric and acoustic guitar, choir
- Hernan Box – Keyboard and music sequencer
- Felipe Kakulas – Bass and Hammond organ
- Marcos Dawson – Drums and percussion
- Mateo Habben – Clarinet
- Adan Hutterer – Trombone

== Charts ==
Chart (1999)	Peak position
Australia (ARIA)	159
