= Ross Bolleter =

Australian composer (born 1946)

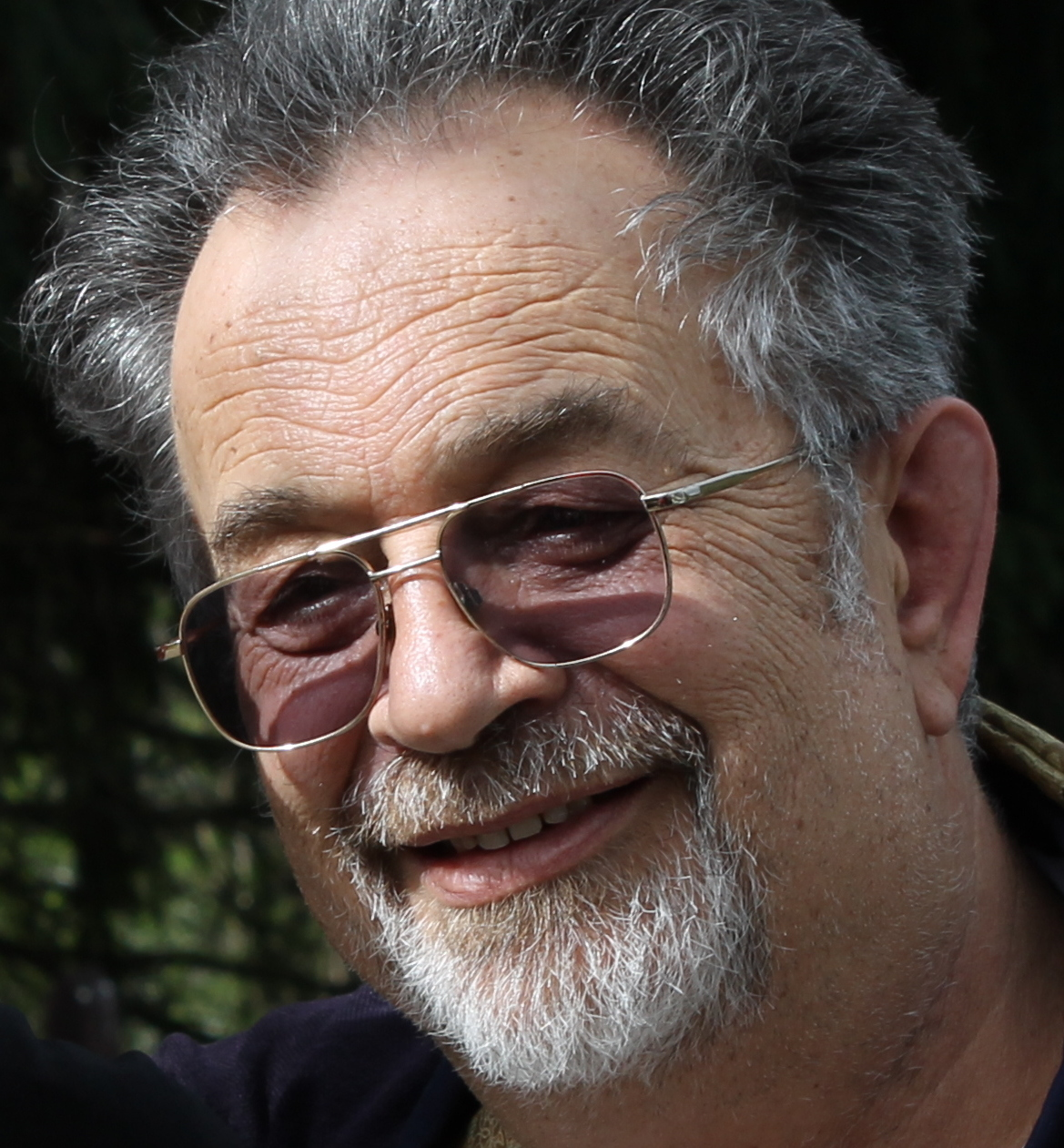
- Bolleter at a ZGWA gathering in 2012
- Born: 1946 (age 79–80); Subiaco, Western Australia
- Education: University of Western Australia
- Occupation: Composer
- Known for: Ruined pianos
- Website: Official website

Ross Bolleter (born 1946 in Subiaco) is an Australian composer and musician whose work is focused on ruined pianos, abandoned pianos that have been warped and changed naturally by time and weather. He is a founding member of The Blackeyed Susans and co-founder of World Association for Ruined Piano Studies (WARPS) with Stephen Scott. In addition to teaching music, Bolleter also taught Zen Buddhism prior to his retirement in 2023.

== Career ==
Bolleter was given his first instrument, a piano accordion, by his parents when he was 11 years old. He learned to play piano in the 1960s and began writing poetry at 17. He then pursued a bachelor's degree in English and music at University of Western Australia (UWA). He studied under Alice Carrard, David Tunley, and John Exton, the latter introducing him to the music of Cage, Boulez, and Stockhausen. At the time, UWA had not yet established its conservatory, so he studied medieval music. After finishing his degree in 1967, he spent four years as a schoolteacher in Esperance and Katanning. Bolleter played piano with the house band at a hotel in Parmelia (later bought out by Hilton) for six years, spending the final year playing solo in the front bar. He later held various other jobs, including a deckhand, an orderly and an apprentice roof plumber.

In the 1980s, he formed a musical improvisation duo, Alone Together, with flautist Tos Mahoney. They released Openings in 1982 on Wasit Music. Bolleter was first inspired to explore prepared piano in the 1980s during an improvisation session with his friend Ryszard Ratajczak, who stuck things into the strings of his double bass to change the sound. He released his cassette The Temple of Joyous Bones in 1985 on Homegrown Headroom. He received a creative development grant from the Department of Culture and the Arts in 1986 to develop skills and techniques on the prepared piano and accordion. In June 1987, during a family trip to Nallan Sheep Station in Cue, he was tipped off about an abandoned piano that had sat on a tennis court in direct sunlight and through a flood for a year before being moved to a nearby shed. This was his first experience with what he calls "ruined" pianos: pianos subject to weather and time, warping and decaying the wood and strings in a way that produces unpredictable sounds. When the property was sold many years later, he was invited to relocate the piano to his home in Perth, where it remains in his kitchen.

In 1989, he founded The Blackeyed Susans with Phil Kakulas, Rob Snarski, David McComb and Alsy MacDonald. He played organ and accordion in the band before leaving to play piano bars in Japan. Also in 1989, he started the Synchronicity Project, a collection of "intuitive pieces" of improvisation, wherein musicians performed in different locations across Australia and the world. "Simulplay 1" in September 1989 saw Jim Denley playing flute to a live audience in Linz, accompanied from the ABC radio studios in Perth by Bolleter on piano and accordion and Carol Henning on a plastic trombone. The second work, "That Time/Simulplay 2", was a piece for two musicians on opposite sides of the continent. They played simultaneously but were unable to hear each other, while an audience listened to the overlapping audio. This performance had Ryszard Ratajczak on double bass at ABC FM Sydney and Bolleter on two different pianos (standard and prepared), played through on separate recordings, from ABC's Perth studios. "Time/Simulplay 2" was released as part of the album Crow Country in 2000. Bolleter's next radiophonic piece was "Pocket Sky/Simulplay 3" on 21 October 1991. It included musicians Jim Denley (Radio ORF Vienna), Stevie Wishart (BBC Radio London), David Moss (SFR Berlin), Jon Rose (ABC Sydney) and Simone De Haan (ABC Melbourne). It was later released as a CD under the same name in 2004.

In 1991, Bolleter and Stephen Scott started the World Association of Ruined Piano Studies (WARPS), a record label and informal group of ruined piano musicians. Michal Murin established a subsidiary of WARPS in Slovakia under the name Piano Hotel in 1997. In 1996, he and several other left-hand piano players (Michal Murin, Zdeněk Plachý, Milan Adamčiak, Stephen Scott, Dan Wiencek, and Nathan Crotty) simultaneously played damaged pianos across Europe, the United States and Australia. The result, Left Hand of the Universe, was released on CD in 1997 by WARPS.

In 2005, following an installation (Piano Labyrinth) of 17 ruined pianos at the Perth Institute of Contemporary Arts (PICA), Bolleter collaborated with York olive farmers Kim Hack and Penny Mossop to create the country's first Ruined Piano Sanctuary. Here, around forty pianos are left to decay in the elements in dams, groves and fields. Bolleter has performed on and exhibited ruined pianos across Australia, including at numerous Totally Huge New Music Festivals, including the Ruined Piano Convergence in 2005. In 2008, he performed Ruined at the 10 Days on the Island Festival, followed by the show Piano! at the Australian National Academy of Music in 2009 and 2010. In 2010, he installed 18 ruined pianos at the Tasmanian Museum and Art Gallery as part of the 10 Days on the Island Festival. His ruined pianos have been featured in Andrew Ford's book A Defence of Classical Music (2005); in Robert Castiglione's film Invitation to Ruin, which was shown at the Totally Huge New Music Festival in 2015; and in musicologist Tim Rutherford-Johnson's book Music After the Fall (2017). In April 2025, he performed Lee Buddle's score for The Little Prince at Spare Parts Puppet Theatre.

Other artists Bolleter has worked with include Kavisha Mazzella, Lindsay Vickery, Ernie Althoff and KK Null. Since 2010, he has collaborated with Antoinette Carrier, who marries the art of weaving with the piano. Carrier's Nothing as a Thing was released on the WARPS label in 2012. He has also worked with Anthony Cormican, who sang songs written by Bolleter on Songs from the Third Watch and who, in 2017, performed Quarry Music with him as a sound installation at the Totally Huge New Music Festival at PICA.

Bolleter's Crow Country was nominated as one of the 10 best albums of 1999 by Cadence Magazine and Secret Sandhills and Satellites (2006) was voted best CD of September 2006 by Blow Up magazine and #2 CD of the year by the French magazine dMute.

== Zen Buddhism ==
Until his retirement in 2023, Bolleter was a Zen Buddhist teacher in the Diamond Sangha tradition. He trained with Robert Aitken and John Tarrant from 1982 to 1992, when he was authorised by Tarrant to teach. He received transmission from both Aitken and Tarrant in 1997. He taught primarily in the Zen Group of Western Australia (ZGWA) but has also taught extensively elsewhere in Australia and in New Zealand. He has given transmission to: Mary Jaksch, Susan Murphy, Bob Joyner, Ian Sweetman, Glenn Wallis, Mari Rhydwen and Arthur Wells and has authorised Christopher Barker and Jane Gyngell Taylor to teach. He continues to work with ZGWA "in an emeritus capacity."

== Personal life ==
Bolleter has two children, Amanda and Julian. As of 2015, he had five ruined pianos in the kitchen of his Perth home.

== Selected works ==
=== Books ===
- 1986: Fostering Creative Improvisation at the Keyboard: A Handbook for Piano Teachers, R. Bolleter. ISBN 0731624173
- 2004: All the Iron Night (edited by Andrew Burke), Smokebush Press. ISBN 0975169505
- 2005: The Well Weathered Piano, WARPS.
- 2009: Piano Hill, Fremantle Press. ISBN 9781921361647
- 2014: The Five Ranks of Dongshan: Keys to Enlightenment, Wisdom Publications. ISBN 9780861715305
- 2017: Du piano-épave / The Well Weathered Piano (bilingual edition), Editions Lenka Lente. ISBN 979-10-94601-17-4
- 2018: The Crow Flies Backwards and Other New Zen Koans, Wisdom Publications. ISBN 978-1614292944
- 2020: Blind Summits (with Christopher Konrad), Sunline Press. ISBN 9780648486541
- 2022: Average Human Heart: left hand stories, Editions Lenka Lente. ISBN 979-10-94601-49-5
- 2022: The Piano Book (with Antoinette Carrier), WARPS.
- 2025: Suivez ma Trace / Track Me Down (bilingual edition), Editions Lenka Lente. ISBN 979-10-94601-59-4

=== Discography ===
Year	Title	Label	Record number	Notes	Refs
1982	Openings	Wasit Music		With Tos Mahoney	
1985	Temple of Joyous Bones	Homegrown Headroom	001		
1986	Sky Burial	Wasit Music		With Nathan Crotty	
1991	Pocket Sky				
1993	Country of Here Below	Tall Poppies	TP045		
1997	The Night Moves on Little Feet	WARPS	W03	With Rob Muir	
1997	Left Hand of the Universe	WARPS	W02		
2000	Crow Country	Pogus	P21021-2		
2002	Satellites	WARPS	W06		
2002	Secret Sandhills	WARPS	W05		
2004	Paradise Café	Sunset Ostrich	S01		
2004	Pocket Sky	WARPS			
2006	Secret Sandhills and Satellites	Emanem Records	4128	With Anthony Cormican	
2008	Café Sophia	Sunset Ostrich	S02		
2009	Five by Five	WARPS	W11	DVD of 5 pieces in 5.1 Surround	
2009	Intimate Ruins	WARPS	W10		
2010	Night Kitchen: An Hour of Ruined Pianos	Emanem Records	5008		
2011	Piano Dreaming	WARPS	W12	2nd edition	
2011	Spring in Iraq	WARPS	W13	2nd edition, with Anthony Cormican	
2011	Solitary Light	WARPS	W14		
2011	Gust	WARPS	W15	2nd edition	
2011	Music of Chance	WARPS	W16	2nd edition	
2012	Concertino Latino	Sunset Ostrich	SO3	With Anthony Cormican	
2012	Vault	WARPS/Myo On		With David Kotlowy	
2013	High Rise Piano	WARPS	W19		
2013	Songs from the Third Watch: a song cycle	WARPS	W18	With Anthony Cormican	
2014	Frontier Piano	WARPS	W20		
2014	Music of Chance	WARPS	W21	2nd edition	
2015	While my coffee cools	WARPS	W22	Bolleter's poetry set to music	
2017	Quarry Music	WARPS	W23	With Anthony Cormican	
2017	Inland Sea	WARPS	W25	With Martin Seddon	
2017	Night is a world lit by itself	WARPS	W26	Total Piano, volume 1	
2018	Speak Love	WARPS	W27	Total Piano, volume 2	
2019	Beloved on this Earth: a song cycle	WARPS	W28	With Anthony Cormican	
2019	Café Antoinette			With Anthony Cormican	
2019	Heard from Earth	WARPS	W28	Total Piano, volume 3	
2020	Terra Incognita	WARPS	W29	Total Piano, volume 4	
2021	Ross Bolleter’s Total Piano, vol. 1-4	Thödol Music			
2021	Closer than Breathing	WARPS	W30	With Sylvain Roux	
2021	Compound Fracture	WARPS	W31	With Antoinette Carrier	
2022	Beloved on this Earth: a song cycle	WARPS	W29	2nd edition, with Anthony Cormican	
2023	Darkshine: a synchronous creation	WARPS	W32	With Eduardo Cossio	
2023	The Synchronicity Project	Thödol Music	THO052	Triple album including Closer than Breathing, Compound Fracture and Darkshine	
2023	Such & Such	Thödol Music		With Eduardo Cossio	
2023	Such & Such	WARPS	W33	With Eduardo Cossio	
2024	The Colour of a Thousand Miles	WARPS	W34		

Additionally, he performed “Nallan Void” on New Albion Records' Austral Voices in 1990 and "Hymn to Ruin" on Margaret Leng Tan's She Herself Alone in 2010.
