= The Jackson Code =

Australian musical group

- Origin: Perth, Australia
- Genres: Rock; country; folk
- Years active: 1988–1990; 1992–1996
- Labels: Waterfront; Citadel; Ra; Hi Gloss
- Spinoffs: The Blackeyed Susans
- Spinoff of: Wet Taxis, Chad's Tree
- Past members: see Members

The Jackson Code were an Australian rock, country and folk band, which formed in Perth in 1988. The original line-up was Kenny Davis Jr on accordion and keyboards; Jason Kain on guitar (ex-Wet Taxis, Chad's Tree), Mark Snarski on guitar and vocals (ex-Chad's Tree) and Kathy Wemyss on vocals and trumpet (ex-Wet Taxis, Chad's Tree). The group released four studio albums Del Musical Del Mismo Nombre (1989), Strange Cargo (1992), Draggin' the River (1993) and The Things You Need (1995) before disbanding in 1996.

== Biography ==
=== 1988–1991: Formation ===
The Jackson Code were formed in 1988 in Perth as a country, folk four-piece by Kenny Davis Jr on accordion and keyboards; Jason Kain on guitar (ex-Wet Taxis, Chad's Tree), Mark Snarski (a.k.a. Marek Snarski) on guitar and vocals (Chad's Tree) and Kathy Wemyss on vocals and trumpet (ex-Wet Taxis, Chad's Tree) while Chad's Tree were about to disband. From September 1988, Snarski started writing non-Chad Tree material, which included tracks working with Kain and Wemyss, "Kerosene", "Joe's Flame", "Bringer of Light", "Strange Lullaby" and "Hotel Stationery". In 1991, Snarski described their early performances:

It actually started out one night when Mathew De La Hunty asked me if I'd support Tall Tales and True as a solo act; and I thought 'Ohh, no, what I'll do is rope in Jason and Kenny.' and I rang Mathew back and said 'pay us a little more money and I'll do it as the Jackson Code.' It was actually Jason, Kenny and myself who played the first night and we roped in Kathy for the second night.

— Mark Snarski

Snarski had relocated to Sydney and for the band's debut album, Del Musical Del Mismo Nombre, he used the previously written material and added Mark Dawson on drums, Amanda Pearson on vocals and percussion and Barry Turnbull on bass guitar. It was released in August 1989 on the Waterfront label to critical acclaim, and was re-released on CD in 1993. A major influence for Snarski was his trip to Spain, the album's title is Spanish for "From the Musical of the Same Name". The Jackson Code recorded the album in four days on a budget of $1000. The lush romanticism of the songs had critics searching for superlatives. Writing in Rolling Stone, reviewer Jon Casimir described it as one of the minor masterpieces of 1989. According to Casimir they took inspiration for its "self-styled urban Romantic Cabaret" from German writers Brecht and Weill, as well as Tom Waits. They promoted the album with national tours, playing shows in Sydney and Melbourne. Rather than capitalise on their acclaim however, Snarski took a hiatus: travelling for two years in Spain and USA.

=== 1992–1996: Citadel and Ra Records ===
Snarski revived the Jackson Code in 1992 to record their second studio album, Strange Cargo. Davis Jnr, Kain, Snarski and Wemyss were joined in the studio by Dawson, Pearson and Turnbull, together with string, brass and hand-clap sections. Strange Cargo was released on Citadel Records in August 1992. It had been recorded and mixed within one week. The Canberra Times' Rebecca Lang praised Wemyss' "riveting" vocals on "Trap the Light" and "Lucifer's Polka" and Snarski's lyrics "dubbed 'aural film noir,'>" Australian musicologist Ian McFarlane noticed Snarski's "melodramatic vignettes, detailing a range of emotions and shady characters. The music ranged from rock to pop to country to jazz to European folk." At the ARIA Music Awards of 1993 it was nominated for Best Independent Release.

The band signed to RooArt in 1993 and released one of that years' finest albums, Draggin' the River in December. Music journalist Ed Nimmervoll reviewed it, "Snarski invented a dark, brooding, menacing world for his songs to live in, and each song was like a little snapshot or movie captured in that world." At the ARIA Music Awards of 1994 it was also nominated for Best Independent Release. The band's fourth and last studio album The Things You Need was released in September 1995. McFarlane described the latter two albums, "vivid splashes of literary colour amid a world of grunge and techno." The group issued four non-charting singles during 1993 to 1995.

After touring with American crime writer James Ellroy in 1996, Snarski left Australia for Europe eventually settling in Madrid.

'There was this one afternoon where I'd dropped everyone off and I was carting this amp up the stairs of - what's that theatre we played in St Kilda? I just put it down and decided, I've had enough of this.'

=== Afterwards ===
The Jackson Code's drummer Mark Dawson played with the Blackeyed Susans (also worked with Ed Kuepper). Kenny Davis Jr and Kathy Wemyss also briefly played with the Blackeyed Susans. Wemyss later performed with Midnight Oil at the opening ceremony of the Sydney Olympics in 2000, later she formed her own band Wemo. Davis joined Decoder Ring. Barry Turnbull and Mandy Pearson formed another group Love Me.

The Jackson Code's retrospective compilation double album, The Second Greatest Story Ever Told (September 1998) has one disc of tracks from the four studio albums and a second disc of rarities. In 2003, Del Musical Del Mismo Nombre was re-issued on CD format by Citadel Records. In June 2006, Snarski in Belgium sang with a specially reformed the Triffids for "An Evening with the Triffids" – an exhibition and show in remembrance of their lead singer David McComb. The Jackson Code's "Everybody's Got Something to Lose" was used in the Australian television series Heartbreak High Season 1, Episode 9 "Family Addition" in April 1994. Del Musical Del Mismo Nombre was re-released in January 2011.

== Members ==
- Mark Snarski - vocals, electric & acoustic guitar
- Kathy Wemyss - vocals, trumpet, castanets
- Mark Dawson (aka Bongo Fury) - drums
- Jason Kain - electric & acoustic guitar
- Kenny Davis Jr - piano, hammond organ, accordion
- Barry Turnbull - electric & acoustic bass
- Mandy Pearson - vocals, percussion

== Discography ==
=== Studio albums ===
Title	Album details
Del Musical Del Mismo Nombre	Released: August 1989; Label: Waterfront (DAMP 115); Format: LP, Cassette
Strange Cargo	Released: August 1992; Label: Citadel (citcd528); Format: CD
Draggin' the River	Released: December 1993; Label: Ra Records (4509938842); Format: CD
The Things You Need	Released: September 1995; Label: Ra Records (0630111812); Format: CD

=== Compilation albums ===
Title	Album details
The Second Greatest Story Ever Told	Released: September 1998; Label: Silk Sheen (SILK008); Format: 2×CD

=== Singles ===
- "Who's Watching Who?" - Ra (September 1993)
- "Poison Berries" - Ra (January 1993)
- "Bring Yourself Home to Me" - Ra (January 1994)
- "The Things You Need" - Ra (July 1995)

== Awards and nominations ==
=== ARIA Music Awards ===
The ARIA Music Awards is an annual awards ceremony held by the Australian Recording Industry Association. They commenced in 1987.

Year	Nominee / work	Award	Result	Ref.
1993	Strange Cargo	Best Independent Release	Nominated	
1994	Dragging the River	Best Independent Release	Nominated	
