= Mary Mac =

Single by The Blackeyed Susans

from the album Mouth To Mouth
- Released: October 1996
- Recorded: Fortissimo Sound Studios; South Melbourne; Autumn 1995
- Genre: Rock / Folk rock
- Length: 16:11
- Label: Hi Gloss Records
- Songwriter(s): Phil Kakulas
- Producer(s): Phil Kakulas

The Blackeyed Susans singles chronology
"Let’s Live" (1995)	"Mary Mac" (1996)	"Smokin' Johnny Cash" (1997)

"Mary Mac" was the second single released by Australian rock band The Blackeyed Susans from their fourth studio album, Mouth To Mouth. It was released on the Hi Gloss Record label in October 1996, three months later. The album was recorded in the autumn of 1995 at the Fortissimo Sound Studios in Melbourne.

"Mary Mac" was the most successful Blackeyed Susans song and became an essential part of their catalog. The B-sides were bonus tracks; a cover of The Go-Betweens song, "Dive for Your Memory", a cover of Canadian country music artist Hank Snow's "Ninety Miles Per Hour" and "Someone Watching Over Me", an original recorded by Phil Kakulas on an 8-track in a spare room in Abbotsford in 1992.

In a review on AllMusic, Ned Raggett calls the lyrics "unsurprisingly not quite as easygoing as the music" and says Kathryn Wemyss' backing vocals add "to the jaunty feeling of the piece". David Landgren states: "After you've heard it a couple of times it's difficult to avoid not wanting to singing along (i.e.: bellowing at the top of your voice) yourself."

== Track listing ==
No.	Title	Writer(s)	Producer(s)	Length
1.	"Mary Mac"	Phil Kakulas	Phil Kakulas	3:40
2.	"Dive for Your Memory"	Grant McLennan, Robert Forster	Phil Kakulas	5:22
3.	"90 Miles Per Hour (Down a Dead End Street)"	Don Robertson, Hal Blair	The Blackeyed Susans	3:17
4.	"Someone Watching Over Me"	David McComb, Will Akers		3:52

== Personnel ==
=== Musicians ===
Track 1

- Rob Snarski - vocals, guitars, robeno
- Phil Kakulas - bass, percussion
- Kiernan Box - piano, organ
- Dan Luscombe - fuzz guitar
- Kathryn Wemyss - backing vocals
- Nick Elliott - tambourine
- Ashley Davies - drums

Track 2

- Rob Snarski - vocals, guitars
- Phil Kakulas - electric, double bass
- Kiernan Box - piano, organ

Track 3

- Rob Snarski - vocals, guitars
- Phil Kakulas - electric, double bass
- Kiernan Box - piano, organ

Track 4

- Rob Snarski - vocals
- Phil Kakulas - bass, shaker
- David McComb - guitar
- 'Evil' Graham Lee - guitar

=== Production credits ===
- Phil Kakulas - Producer (tracks 1 and 2), Recording (track 4), Mixing (track 4)
- Victor van Vugt - Recording (track 1)
- Andy Parsons - Recording (tracks 2 and 3), Mixing (track 2)
- Tony Cohen - Mixing (tracks 1 and 3)
- Julian Wu - Mixing (track 4)
- Don Bartley - Mastering
- Tony Mahony - Photography
