= Mudin =

Mudin is a surname of differing origins. It may refer to:

- Gul Mudin (1994–2010), Afghan child murdered by United States troops in the Maywand District murders
- Imre Mudin (1887–1918), Hungarian track and field athlete
- István Mudin (1881–1918), Hungarian track and field athlete
