= All Souls Alive =

Studio album by The Blackeyed Susans
- Released: (Australia) December 1993 (United States) 29 April 1994 (Europe) July 1994
- Recorded: Fortissimo Studios, Melbourne; July 1993
- Genre: Rock / Folk rock
- Length: 43:30
- Label: (Australia) Torn and Frayed/Shock (United States) Frontier
- Producer: Phil Kakulas

The Blackeyed Susans chronology
| Welcome Stranger (1992) | All Souls Alive (1993) | Hard Liquor, Soft Music (1994) |

Professional ratings
Review scores
| Source | Rating |
|---|---|
| Allmusic | 4/5 stars |

All Souls Alive is the second studio album by Australian rock band The Blackeyed Susans. The album was released in December 1993 on the independent record label, Torn and Frayed, and was distributed by Shock Records. The album was released in the United States by Frontier Records on 29 April 1994. Two singles lifted off the album were released in Australia in July 1994, "Dirty Water" and "This One Eats Souls".

== Content and history ==
The album features ten tracks, eight penned by Phil Kakulas and David McComb, as well as the Leonard Cohen/Phil Spector classic "Memories" and a version of the Johnny Paycheck song "Apartment No 9".

All Souls Alive was released in America on Frontier Records in April 1994. The album was also released in the UK, Greece, Germany, Spain, Belgium, Holland, Italy and Sweden in July 1994. The album got great reviews in the UK press and airplay on Radio One.

== Reception ==
Graham Lee said of the album, "You couldn't describe it as a sunny record, I don't think anyone would've been expecting that. But there's a willingness to experiment."

== Track listing ==
All written tracks by Phil Kakulas and David McComb unless otherwise indicated.

1. "A Curse On You" (Phil Kakulas, David McComb, Graham Lee) – 3:34
2. "We Could’ve Been Someone" – 4:21
3. "Every Gentle Soul" (David McComb, Will Akers) – 3:31
4. "Memories" (Leonard Cohen, Phil Spector) – 6:01
5. "Sheets of Rain" (Phil Kakulas) – 3:30
6. "Reveal Yourself" – 4:15
7. "I Can See Now" – 3:58
8. "Apartment No. 9" (Johnny Paycheck, R. Austin) – 2:52
9. "Dirty Water" (Phil Kakulas, P. Van Zalm) – 4:48
10. "This One Eats Souls" – 6:33

== Personnel ==
- Rob Snarski – vocals, backing vocals, tambourine, acoustic guitar, guiro
- Phil Kakulas – double bass, electric bass, fuzz bass, piano, towbar, jingle bells, cabosa, cymbals, backing vocals, sound effects, TV
- Graham Lee – pedal steel, lap steel, electric guitar, acoustic guitar, autoharp, backing vocals, heavy breathing
- Warren Ellis – violin, Korg organ, Hammond organ, Fender Rhodes, cheesy organ, accordion, piano, harpsichord
- David McComb – vocals (on "Memories"), electric guitar, cheesy organ
- Jim White – drums
- Marko Halstead – mandolin, backing vocals
- Andy Parsons – Grampian Ambiophonic Unit Type 666, harpsichord
- Metronome – metronome

== Charts ==
| Chart (1993–1994) | Peak position |
|---|---|
| Australian Albums (ARIA) | 175 |
