= Chad's Tree =

Australian rock band

- Origin: Perth, Western Australia, Australia
- Genre: Rock
- Years active: 1983–1989
- Labels: Hot, Nude, Rough Trade, Waterfront
- Past members: see Members list below

Chad's Tree were an Australian rock band, formed in Perth in 1983 by two brothers, Mark and Rob Snarski, as the driving force. The band's brittle, off-kilter sound evoked the sense of distance, desolation, harshness and loneliness of the Nullarbor Plain (but also its fragile nature), much in the same fashion as fellow Perth outfit The Triffids.

== History ==
The Snarskis were born in London, to Polish refugee parents, and grew up on a 36 hectare farm on the outskirts of Perth, Western Australia.

We grew up with AM radio, in the country. We'd watch those TV specials of the '70s: Tom Jones, Engelbert Humperdinck, even Bobbie Gentry. I think those things must have gotten under our skin.

— Mark Snarski

We'd see someone singing Billie Holiday and maybe hunt down a few of her records. I don't know why it appealed. I think it was probably in the delivery of words. Frank Sinatra once said that Billie Holiday taught him how to deliver a song. I can hear that.

— Rob Snarski

Their teenage musical passions were shared – Explosive Hits '77, the Doors, the Velvet Underground, Television.

The band relocated to Sydney in 1984, the remainder of the band followed some months later in James Hurst's kombi. In 1985 Amanda Brown (The Go-Betweens) was asked to record with the band (she appears on two tracks on the band's debut album Buckle in the Rail) and was invited to join the band. In the end she rejected the offer and became a permanent member of The Go-Betweens.

Chad's Tree supported not only John Cale in their first year, but also Nico, at the Prince of Wales in St Kilda, shortly after they moved east in the mid-1980s

Chad's Tree issued its debut 7-inch single "Crush the Lily"/"Toll for Josephine" in November 1985 on the Hot label. They released subsequent singles, "Sweet Jesus Blue Eyes"/"To the Highest Bidder" in February 1987 and "Stroller in the Attic"/"The Orchard" in March 1988, as well as their debut album Buckle in the Rail in January 1987 on the Nude label. The "Crush the Lily" and "Sweet Jesus Blue Eyes" singles were also combined on the four-track, 12-inch EP Chad's Tree for release in the United Kingdom through Rough Trade Records.

There were a number of different line-ups over the course of six years. As well as Kim Bettenay, the band's bass players included Mark Hemery, Peter Michael, Barry Turnbull and Simon Kain. Susan Grigg joined on piano and violin in 1987, and was replaced by Kathy Wemyss in 1989. Jason Kain (lead guitar, ex-Wet Taxis) also replaced Robert Snarski, who returned to Perth in October 1988 and went on to form The Blackeyed Susans The band issued a second album, Kerosene, in March 1989.

I'd also threatened the band that I was going to Europe at the beginning of the year if this record hadn't been completed by then. So I was walking to work one day and walked past a travel agency and saw a picture of a Blue-footed booby bird, which lives on the Galápagos Islands. It has a very strange way of mating, it shakes its blue feet at its companion. And I thought 'I'd really like to go and see the blue-footy booby bird in the Galápagos Islands. But I've always wanted to go to Europe: So I'll go there first.' Knowing that the Galápagos Islands are in South America, I thought 'well I'll have to learn Spanish.' So about a week later, I informed the remaining members of Chad's Tree that I was going to Europe the next year and that I was going to buy my ticket the next day, and we swung into action and got some money from Waterfront to finish off the recording. So that was basically the end of Chad's Tree.

— Mark Snarski

After the band broke up Mark Snarski and Wemyss formed the Jackson Code. After touring with American crime writer James Ellroy in 1996, Mark left Australia for Europe finally settling in Madrid. Rob Snarski lives in Melbourne, where he joined and is a pivotal member of The Blackeyed Susans.

In March 2010 Memorandum Records released a compilation album, Crossing Off the Miles, which included both studio albums, all the band's single and B-sides, together with eleven early demos and live recordings. The release also included a 32-page booklet with photos and liner notes from eight contributors including both Rob and Mark Snarski, authors Niall Lucy and David Nichols and band insiders.

=== Members ===
- Mark Snarski – vocals
- Rob Snarski – vocals, guitar, bass
- Jason Kain – guitar
- Kathy Wemyss – vocals, violin, trumpet
- James Hurst – drums
- Kenny Davis Junior – violin
- Sue Grigg – violin, piano
- Amanda Brown – violin
- Rodney Howard – bass
- Peter Michael – bass
- Kim Bettenay – bass
- Barry Turnbull – bass
- Mark Hemery – bass
- Simon Kain – bass

== Discography ==
=== Albums/EPs ===
- Chad's Tree (EP) – Hot Records (HOT 1229) (1986)
- Buckle in the Rail – Nude Records (Fine 1) (January 1987)
- Kerosene – Nude Records (DAMP96) (March 1989)
- Crossing Off the Miles – Memorandum Records (MEMO7) (22 March 2010)

=== Singles ===
- "Crush The Lily" / "Toll For Josephine" – Hot Records (HOT 727) (November 1985)
- "Sweet Jesus Blue Eyes" / "To The Highest Bidder" – Nude Records (FIG 100) (February 1987)
- "The Orchard" / "Stroller in the Attic" – Nude Records (FIG 110) (March 1988)

=== Compilations ===
- This Is Too Hot – Hot Records (1986) – "Crush The Lily"
- High Temperature: A Collection Of Hot Records From 1982 – 1985 – Hot Records (1986) – "Crush the Lily"
