= Depends on What You Mean by Love =

...Depends On What You Mean By Love

EP by The Blackeyed Susans
- Released: 1991
- Recorded: London; 1990
- Genre: Rock / Folk rock
- Length: 12:53
- Label: Waterfront Records
- Producer: David McComb

The Blackeyed Susans chronology
Anchor Me (1991)	...Depends On What You Mean By Love (1991)	Welcome Stranger (1992)

...Depends On What You Mean By Love is an EP by The Blackeyed Susans, released in late 1991.

== Track listing ==
1. "Ocean of You" (David McComb) – 3:33
2. "Close Watch" (John Cale) – 2:59
3. "Will’s Blues" (Will Akers) – 3:22
4. "Spanish is the Loving Tongue" (Traditional) – 2:59

== Personnel ==
- Rob Snarski – vocals
- Kenny Davis Junior – keyboards, piano accordion, samples
- David McComb – keyboards, bass, electric and acoustic guitars, backing vocals
- Joanne Alach – backing vocals

== Charts ==
Chart (1991)	Peak position
Australia (ARIA)	156
