= Dedicated to the Ones We Love =

Studio album by The Blackeyed Susans
- Released: 23 April 2001
- Recorded: Fortissimo Studios, South Melbourne, September–November 2000
- Genres: Rock, folk rock
- Length: 59:30
- Labels: Teardrop, Shock
- Producers: Graham Lee, The Blackeyed Susans

The Blackeyed Susans chronology
La Mascara (1998)	Dedicated to the Ones We Love (2001)	Shangri-La (2003)

Dedicated to the Ones We Love is the fifth studio album by the Australian folk rock group The Blackeyed Susans and was released on 23 April 2001. It is the first issued on their own label, Teardrop, and was distributed through Shock Records. As the name suggests, it is a collection of cover versions, focusing on songs that have influenced and inspired the band. It includes songs made popular by Frank Sinatra, Elvis Presley, The Crystals, Bob Dylan, The Velvet Underground, and, most poignantly, The Triffids. The Triffids were the previous band of David McComb, who had died in 1999 and was a founding member of The Blackeyed Susans. The album was well received by the public and lauded by the critics, a national tour followed keeping the band busy until the end of the year.

== Background ==
Dedicated to the Ones We Love is a covers album by The Blackeyed Susans, focusing on songs that have influenced and inspired the band. In May 2000, the group parted ways with their record company Mds after it was bought by Festival Records. They had been working on their Shangri-La album since mid-1999 but this was postponed until 2002. In September–November 2000, the band recorded Dedicated to the Ones We Love at Fortissimo Studios in South Melbourne. The band's pedal steel guitarist, Graham Lee produced alongside other band members.

On 23 April 2001, the album was released on their own label, Teardrop, and distributed through Shock Records. According to Shock Records, it paid tribute to the influences and aspirations of the band - including songs from Hollywood-period Elvis, epic Sinatra, and street level affirmations by Big Star and The Velvet Underground. It was well received by the public and lauded by the critics. A national tour followed keeping the band busy until the end of the year.

Phil Kakulas, the band's double bassist, described the album, "My idea of going forward is actually going backwards. I like the idea of digging deep. That's why I really liked the covers album that we did". Rob Snarski, lead vocalist, chose "Everyone's Gone to the Moon" after hearing the Nina Simone version from her 1969 album, Nina Simone and Piano. Lisa Miller liked their version of "State Trooper" from Bruce Springsteen's 1982 release Nebraska. Snarski opined that if they were to do a second covers album, "Highway Patrolman" from the same album would be one of his choices – "What a great song about siblings, family, strength and loyalty". Ed Nimmervoll recommended the album, "Imagine Nick Cave trying to emulate Frank Sinatra and you're half-way towards an impression of the Blackeyed Susans' "style"". Other tracks include covers of The Crystals, Bob Dylan, The Velvet Underground, and, most poignantly, The Triffids. The Triffids were the previous band of David McComb, who had died in 1999 and was a founding member of The Blackeyed Susans.

== Track listing ==
All songs written by artists listed. (Note: Songwriting credits per track from Australasian Performing Right Association (APRA).)

No.	Title	Writer(s)	Original artist	Length
1.	"Take Care"	Alex Chilton	Big Star	3:51
2.	"The End of the World"	Sylvia Dee, Arthur Kent	Skeeter Davis	3:07
3.	"Summer Kisses, Winter Tears"	Jack Lloyd, Fred Wise, Ben Weisman	Elvis Presley & The Jordanaires	2:36
4.	""American Sailors" / "Too Hot to Move Too Hot to Think""	David McComb	The Triffids	5:22
5.	"She Hit Me (And It Felt Like a Kiss)"	Gerry Goffin, Carole King	The Crystals	2:58
6.	"I Only Have Eyes for You"	Al Dubin, Harry Warren	Dick Powell	4:00
7.	"I Found a Reason"	Lou Reed	The Velvet Underground	3:37
8.	"Song from Sleep Walk"	Ann Farina, Santo Farina, Johnny Farina, Don Wolf	Santo & Johnny	2:34
9.	"Plastic Jesus"	George M. Cromarty, Paul Edward Rush	The Goldcoast Singers	4:19
10.	"Everyone's Gone to the Moon"	Kenneth George King	Jonathon King	2:50
11.	"The World We Knew"	Bert Kaempfert, Herbert Rehbein, Carl Sigman	Frank Sinatra	3:04
12.	"Quasimodo’s Dream"	David Mason	The Reels	4:35
13.	"I Threw It All Away"	Robert Dylan	Bob Dylan	2:45
14.	"State Trooper"	Bruce Springsteen	Bruce Springsteen	6:56
15.	"If I Can Dream"	Walter Earl Brown	Elvis Presley	3:21
16.	"Private Dancer"	Mark Knopfler	Tina Turner	3:35
Total length:				59:30

== Personnel ==
According to The Blackeyed Susans:

- Rob Snarski – mainly vocals
- Dan Luscombe – mainly guitar and backing vocals
- Kiernan Box – mainly keyboards
- Phil Kakulas – mainly double bass
- Mark Dawson – mainly drums
- Matthew Habben – clarinet, saxophone
- Graham Lee – pedal steel, guitar
- Adam Hutterer – trombone
- Ken Gardner – trumpet
