= This One Eats Souls =

Single by The Blackeyed Susans

from the album All Souls Alive
- A-side: "This One Eats Souls"
- Released: July 1994
- Recorded: Fortissimo Studios; July 1993
- Genre: Rock, Folk rock
- Length: 20:58
- Label: Shock Records
- Songwriter(s): Phil Kakulas, David McComb
- Producer(s): Phil Kakulas

The Blackeyed Susans singles chronology
"This One Eats Souls" (1994)	"Dirty Water" (1994)

"This One Eats Souls" is a single by The Blackeyed Susans, released in July 1994, from their 1993 album, All Souls Alive. The last four tracks are taken from the cassette album Hard Liquor, Soft Music by The Blackeyed Susans Trio.

Allmusic's Ned Raggett describes the song as being "an absolutely bereft-of-hope lyric given beautiful, haunting music."

The song was included on the band's 2009 compilation album Reveal Yourself 1989-2009 and was re-recorded by Rob Snarski on his 2014 solo album, Wounded Bird.

== Track listing ==
This One Eats Souls
No.	Title	Writer(s)	Length
1.	"This One Eats Souls"	Phil Kakulas, David McComb	6:33
2.	"Bird on a Wire"	Leonard Cohen	4:07
3.	"Summer Leaves"	Paul Kelly	3:29
4.	"Life Has Its Little Ups And Downs"	Margaret Ann Rich	3:32
5.	"Lost Highway"	Leon Payne	3:12
Total length:			20:53

== Personnel ==
=== Track 1 ===
- Rob Snarski – vocals, acoustic guitar
- Phil Kakulas – double bass, sound effects
- Graham Lee – pedal steel
- Warren Ellis – violins, accordion, piano, harpsichord
- Metronome – metronome

=== Tracks 2-5 ===
- Rob Snarski – vocals, acoustic guitar
- Phil Kakulas – double bass
- Graham Lee – pedal steel, electric guitar, backing vocals
- Chris Copping – piano on track 4

Recorded by Andy Parsons at Fortissimo Studios, Melbourne in late 1993
