= Spin the Bottle (album) =

Spin The Bottle

Studio album by The Blackeyed Susans
- Released: July 1997
- Recorded: Sing Sing and Fortissimo Studios, Melbourne; Summer, 1996/1997
- Genre: Rock, folk rock
- Length: 47:19
- Label: Hi Gloss Records
- Producer: Victor Van Vugt; Phil Kakulas

The Blackeyed Susans chronology
Some Night, Somewhere (1996)	Spin The Bottle (1997)	La Mascara (1998)

Spin The Bottle is the fourth studio album by The Blackeyed Susans, released in July 1997 on Hi Gloss Records. Initial copies came with a karaoke disc containing instrumental versions of each song. The album was produced by Victor Van Vugt (Nick Cave and the Bad Seeds, Dave Graney and the Coral Snakes, Luna) and featured ten new original songs and a cover of Billie Holiday's "You're My Thrill". Three singles were released from the album - "Smokin' Johnny Cash", "Spin the Wheel" and "Blue Skes, Blue Sea".

== Track listing ==
All songs written by Phil Kakulas, except where noted.

1. "Spin The Wheel" – 3:52
2. "I Am A Singer" – 3:54
3. "Everything I Touch" (Phil Kakulas, Kiernan Box) – 3:43
4. "Smokin’ Johnny Cash" (Phil Kakulas, Rob Snarski, Mark Dawson) – 3:47
5. "Bottle Of Red" – 4:58
6. "Blue Skies, Blue Sea" (Phil Kakulas, Rob Snarski) – 4:03
7. "Untitled" – 4:10
8. "You’re My Thrill" (J Gorney, S Clare) – 5:07
9. "Sweeter Deal" (Kiernan Box, Rob Snarski, Phil Kakulas) – 3:56
10. "Look Away" (Phil Kakulas, Dan Luscome, Rob Snarski) – 6:30
11. "You’re A Good Doctor" (Phil Kakulas, Rob Snarski, Mark Halstead) – 3:15

== Personnel ==
- Rob Snarski – vocals, guitars, whistling
- Phil Kakulas – bass, omnichord
- Kiernan Box – piano, organ, harmonium
- Dan Luscombe – guitars, optigan, vocals, organ
- Mark Dawson – drums, percussion
- Jen Anderson – violin
- Suzanne Simpson – violin
- Deirdre Dowling – viola
- Helen Mountfort – cello
- Matthew Habben – saxophone
- Ken Gardner – trumpet
- Adam Hutterer – trombone
- Mark C Halstead – backing vocals
- Graham Lee – pedal steel, backing vocals
- Lisa Miller – backing vocals
- Jodie Meehan – backing vocals
- Kelly Nash – backing vocals

== Charts ==
Chart (1997)	Peak position
Australian Albums (ARIA)	102
