= Mouth to Mouth (The Blackeyed Susans album) =

Studio album by The Blackeyed Susans
- Released: July 1995
- Recorded: Fortissimo Studios, Melbourne; Autumn, 1995
- Genre: Rock / Folk rock
- Length: 48:22
- Label: Hi Gloss Records
- Producer: Phil Kakulas (with the assistance of Rob Snarski; Victor Van Vugt; Andy Parsons; Tony Cohen)

The Blackeyed Susans chronology
Hard Liquor, Soft Music (1994)	Mouth to Mouth (1995)	Some Night, Somewhere (1996)

Professional ratings
Review scores
Source	Rating
Allmusic	link

Mouth to Mouth is the third studio album by The Blackeyed Susans, released in July, 1995.

== Reception ==
Rolling Stone Australia described the album as, "Dramatic songs of unhealthy obsession wrapped in lush cinematic arrangements, Mouth to Mouth (as in kissing and/or emergency resuscitation) refined the Blackeyed Susans' unique balance of romantic and sinister. A darkly beautiful exploration of passion for the slightly deranged."

== Track listing ==
1. "As It Was" (Phil Kakulas) – 4:32
2. "She Breathes In (She Breathes Out)" (Phil Kakulas, Rob Snarski) – 5:07
3. "Let’s Live" (Phil Kakulas, Rob Snarski) – 4:05
4. "Hey Buddy" (Phil Kakulas) – 4:23
5. "By Your Hand" (David McComb, Rob Snarski) – 2:33
6. "I Can’t Find Your Pulse" (Rob Snarski, Phil Kakulas) – 6:25
7. "Mouth to Mouth" (Phil Kakulas, Rob Snarski) – 4:22
8. "Mary Mac" (Phil Kakulas) – 3:41
9. "The Shadow of Her Smile" (Phil Kakulas, Rob Snarski) – 4:13
10. "I Need You" (Rob Snarski) – 3:50
11. "The End of the Line" (Phil Kakulas, Rob Snarski, Will Akers) – 5:05

== Personnel ==
- Rob Snarski – vocals, electric and acoustic guitars, percussion, tremolo guitar, backing vocals, zobeno, mb bottle, e-bow
- Phil Kakulas – double bass, electric bass, percussion, toon tube, vocals, brigade drum, tambourine, guitar, fuzz bass, vb bottle
- Kiernan Box – piano, organ, harmonica, Wurlitzer piano, bass pedals, vibes
- Graham Lee – pedal steel, lap steel, electric guitars, acoustic guitars, backing vocals
- Mark C Halstead – backing vocals
- Ashley Davies – drum kit
- Dan Luscombe – lead guitar, tremolo guitar, fuzz guitar
- Nick Elliott – tambourine, saxophone,
- Jen Anderson – violins
- Helen Mountfort – cello
- Katherine Wemyss – trumpet, backing vocals
- Chris Boyce – trombone
- Sarah Liversidge – backing vocals
- Richard Nixon – electric triangle

== Charts ==
Chart (1995)	Peak position
Australian Albums (ARIA)	134
