= Michal Murin =

Michal Murin (born 1963), is a Prešov, Bratislava-based artist who has worked across performance, new media, conceptual and sound art.

== Biography ==
Studied mathematic analysis and management at University of Economics in Bratislava (MA) and arts at Faculty of Fine Arts of Technical University in Brno (MA), then he continued his postgraduate studies at AFAD Bratislava (PhD. in art). Started his artistic career as an autodidact in 1983, later wrote his manifestos 'Plays of the Plays'(1985). Works as programmer in MUMPS language MUMPS (1985–1990). Co-founded the group Balvan (1987–92), Transmusic comp. with Milan Adamčiak and Peter Machajdik (1989–96), cycle Musicsolarium (1993–1994), Sound Off (1995–2002), Lengow & HEyeRMEarS (with Jozef Cseres, 1997) and is an international adviser of Rosenberg museum. Co-founded SNEH, WARPS and director of Piano Hotel. Author of project @rtzoom, 1997. Editor of Profil - Contemporary Art Magazine. Writes for radioART. Was lecturing sound art, intermedia, new media, performance art at Faculty of Fine Arts in Brno (2003-4). Is head of studio "Digital media - IDM" at the Faculty of Fine Arts AKU Banská Bystrica and lecturing new media at Faculty of Art in Košice. Founded DigiVAF(ex) (*2004) festival and New Media POINT (*2008), IDM NET.DATA-baze, wrote a text about Jozsef R. Juhász, printed in Budapest in 2008.
