= Kathy Wemyss =

Australian rock musician

- Also known as: Kathy Wemyss
- Born: Kathryn Wemyss
- Genres: Rock
- Instruments: Vocals, violin, guitars
- Years active: 1980–present
- Formerly of: Chad's Tree; The Jackson Code; Wemo

Kathy Wemyss (pronounced 'Weemz') is an Australian rock musician. A multi-instrumentalist, she was a member of Chad's Tree (1989) and The Jackson Code.

== Biography ==
Wemyss was classically trained, due to her Salvation Army upbringing, but in the 1980s and 1990s performed in post punk and rock bands, playing live gigs in inner Sydney. Her groups include, Wet Taxis (1986–1988), Kings of the World (1988–1989), Chad's Tree (1989), The Jackson Code (1989–1990), Pressed Meat & The Smallgoods (1990) and The Blackeyed Susans (1991).

Wemyss displayed a combination of talents - a classically trained voice; playing the trumpet (her signature instrument); the castanets; and more conventionally, the acoustic guitar.

Her talent as a brass player led her to be invited to play with Midnight Oil on tour in the late 1980s. During the 1990s she was an integral member of The Jackson Code to which she brought all the talents mentioned above, along with her skills as songwriter. Her association with Midnight Oil was briefly revived when she was invited to play with them at the opening ceremony of the Sydney Olympics in 2000.

In the early 2000s, she formed her own band called Wemo, for which she composed and sang all the material. Throughout this time she maintained an interest in the indigenous music and culture of the Torres Strait Islands. She became active in academic circles, completing a post-graduate degree at the Sydney Conservatorium of Music which combined her interests in music education, indigenous music and brass instruments. Her interest in the Torres Strait Islands finally led her to resettle there permanently in 2004.
