= J. M. Coetzee bibliography =

J. M. Coetzee is a South African-born novelist, essayist, linguist, translator and recipient of the 2003 Nobel Prize in Literature. He has also won the Booker Prize twice, the Jerusalem Prize, CNA Prize (thrice), the Prix Femina étranger, the Irish Times International Fiction Prize, as well as many other awards and honours, and he holds a number of honorary doctorates and is one of the authors in the English language.

== Novels ==
- Dusklands (1974) ISBN 0-14-024177-9
- In the Heart of the Country (1977) ISBN 0-14-006228-9
- Waiting for the Barbarians (1980) ISBN 0-14-006110-X
- Life & Times of Michael K (1983) ISBN 0-14-007448-1
- Foe (1986) ISBN 0-14-009623-X
- Age of Iron (1990) ISBN 0-14-027565-7
- The Master of Petersburg (1994) ISBN 0-14-023810-7
- Disgrace (1999) ISBN 978-0-14-311528-1
- Elizabeth Costello (2003) ISBN 0-670-03130-5
- Slow Man (2005) ISBN 0-670-03459-2
- Diary of a Bad Year (2007) ISBN 1-84655-120-X
- The Childhood of Jesus (2013) ISBN 978-1-84655-726-2
- The Schooldays of Jesus (2016) ISBN 978-1-91121-535-6
- The Death of Jesus (2019) ISBN 978-1-92226-828-0
- The Pole and Other Stories (2022) ISBN 978-1-52992-063-5

== Autobiographical novels ==
- Boyhood: Scenes from Provincial Life (1997) ISBN 0-14-026566-X
- Youth: Scenes from Provincial Life II (2002) ISBN 0-670-03102-X
- Summertime (2009) ISBN 1-84655-318-0
- Scenes from Provincial Life (2011) ISBN 1-84655-485-3. An edited single volume of Boyhood: Scenes from Provincial Life, Youth: Scenes from Provincial Life II, and Summertime.

== Short fiction ==
Collections

- The Lives of Animals (Princeton, NJ: Princeton University Press, 1999) ISBN 0-691-07089-X
- Three Stories (Melbourne: Text Publishing, 2014) ISBN 9781922182562. Includes: "A House in Spain", "Nietverloren" and "He and His Man".
- Siete cuentos morales (Barcelona: El Hilo de Ariadna/Literatura Random House, 2018), seven stories translated into Spanish from the unpublished manuscript Moral Tales. Moral Tales has also been translated into French and Italian and released as L'abattoir de verre (translated by Georges Lory. Paris: Éditions du Seuil, 2018) and Bugie e altri racconti morali (Torino: Giulio Enaudi Editori, 2019). A Japanese translation, by Nozomi Kubota, was published in 2018 (Kyoto: Jimbun Shoin). The stories in The Pole and Other Stories (except for "Hope") were included in this collection.
- El vigilante de sala / The Museum Guard (Madrid: Museo Nacional del Prado, 2024) ISBN 978-8-48480-615-8

Stories

Title	Year	First published	Reprinted/collected	Notes
A House in Spain	2000	Coetzee, J. M. (2000). "A house in Spain". Architectural Digest. 57 (10): 68–76.	Coetzee, J. M. (2014). Three stories. Melbourne: Text Publishing.	
The African Experience	2002	Coetzee, J. M. (2002). "The African experience". Preservation. 54 (2): 20–24.	Coetzee, J. M. (2014). Three stories. Melbourne: Text Publishing.	Later published as "Nietverloren".
He and His Man	2003	Coetzee, J. M. (2006). Nobel lectures : from the literature laureates, 1986 to 2005. Melbourne: Melbourne University Publishing. pp. He and his man.	Coetzee, J. M. (2014). Three stories. Melbourne: Text Publishing.	
As a Woman Grows Older	2003/2017	Coetzee, J. M. (15 January 2004). "As a woman grows older". The New York Review of Books.	The Pole and Other Stories (2023)	
The Old Woman and the Cats	2008/2013	"La vecchia e i gatti" (September 2014). Aut Aut.	Bruyckere, Berlinde de & J. M. Coetzee (2013). Cripplewood = Kreupelhout. Brussels: Mercatorfonds.; The Pole and Other Stories (2023)	
Nietverloren	2009	Ten Years of the Caine Prize for African Writing (Oxford: New Internationalist Publications, 2009). ISBN 9781906523244		Originally published as "The African experience" (2002).
The Dog	2017	Coetzee, J. M. (4 December 2017). "The dog". The New Yorker. Vol. 93, no. 39. pp. 60–61.	The Pole and Other Stories (2023)	
The Glass Abattoir	2016/2017	"El matadero de cristal", in Siete cuentos morales (2018).	The Monthly (December 2022); The Pole and Other Stories (2023)	
Hope			The Pole and Other Stories (2023)	
Lies	2011	"Lies". The New York Review. December 21, 2017.		
Story	2014	"Una historia", in Siete cuentos morales (2018).		
Vanity	2016	"Vanidad", in Siete cuentos morales (2018).		

== Criticism ==
- Truth in Autobiography (Cape Town: University of Cape Town Press, 1984)
- White Writing: On the Culture of Letters in South Africa (New Haven, CT: Yale University Press, 1988) ISBN 0-300-03974-3
- Doubling the Point: Essays and Interviews, ed. David Attwell (Cambridge, MA: Harvard University Press, 1992) ISBN 0-674-21518-4
- Giving Offense: Essays on Censorship (Chicago, IL: University of Chicago Press, 1996) ISBN 0-226-11176-8
- The Novel in Africa (Berkeley: Doreen B. Townsend Center for the Humanities, 1999)
- Stranger Shores: Literary Essays, 1986–1999 (London: Secker & Warburg, 2001) ISBN 0-14-200137-6
- The Nobel Lecture in Literature, 2003 (New York, NY: Penguin 2004) ISBN 0-14-303453-7
- Inner Workings: Literary Essays, 2000–2005 (London: Harvill Secker, 2007) ISBN 0-09-950614-9
- Here and Now: Letters, 2008-2011 (New York, NY: Viking, 2013) ISBN 0-670-02666-2, a collection of letters exchanged with Paul Auster
- The Good Story: Exchanges on Truth, Fiction and Psychotherapy, with Arabella Kurtz (New York, NY: Viking, 2015) ISBN 978-0-525-42951-7
- Late Essays: 2006-2017 (London: Harvill Secker, 2017) ISBN 978-1-91121-543-1
- Speaking in Tongues, with Mariana Dimópulos (New York, NY: Liveright, 2025) ISBN 978-1-324-09645-0

== Translations and introductions ==
- A Posthumous Confession by Marcellus Emants (Boston: Twayne, 1976 & London: Quartet, 1986). Translated and Introduced by J. M. Coetzee. ISBN 0-8057-8152-8
- The Expedition to the Baobab Tree by Wilma Stockenström (Johannesburg: Jonathan Ball, 1983 & London: Faber, 1984). Translated by J. M. Coetzee. ISBN 0-571-13112-3
- Landscape with Rowers: Poetry from the Netherlands (Princeton, NJ: Princeton University Press, 2004). Translated and Introduced by J. M. Coetzee ISBN 0-691-12385-3
- Introduction to Robinson Crusoe by Daniel Defoe (Oxford World's Classics) ISBN 0-19-210033-5
- Introduction to Brighton Rock by Graham Greene (Penguin Classics) ISBN 0-14-243797-2
- Introduction to Dangling Man by Saul Bellow (Penguin Classics) ISBN 0-14-303987-3
- Introduction to The Vivisector by Patrick White (Penguin, 1999) ISBN 0-14-310567-1
- Introduction to The Confusions of Young Törless by Robert Musil (Penguin Classics, 2001) ISBN 978-0-14-218000-6
- Introduction to Samuel Beckett: The Grove Centenary Edition vol. IV by Samuel Beckett, edited by Paul Auster (New York: Grove Press, 2006) ISBN 0-8021-1820-8
- Foreword to Africa and Her Animals: Philosophical and Practical Perspectives, edited by Rainer Ebert & Anteneh Roba (Pretoria: University of South Africa Press, 2018) ISBN 978-1-86888-900-6

== Interviews ==
- "Speaking J. M. Coetzee", Stephen Watson, Speak vol. 1, no. 3 (1978): 21–24.
- "An Interview with J. M. Coetzee", Tony Morphet, Social Dynamics vol. 10, no. 1 (1984): 62-65.
- "An Interview with J. M. Coetzee", Jean Sévry, Commonwealth: Essays and Studies vol. 9, no. 1 (1986): 1–7.
- "Two Interviews with J. M. Coetzee, 1983 and 1987," Tony Morphet, TriQuarterly 69 (Spring-Summer 1987): 454–64.
- "On the Question of Autobiography: Interview with J. M. Coetzee", David Attwell, Current Writing: Text and Reception in South Africa vol. 3, no. 1 (1991): 117–122.
- "An Interview with J. M. Coetzee", Richard Begam, Contemporary Literature vol. 33, no. 3 (1992): 419–431.
- "An Interview with J. M. Coetzee", World Literature Today vol. 70, no. 1 (1996): 107–110.
- "Voice and Trajectory: An Interview with J. M. Coetzee", Joanna Scott, Salmagundi 114/115 (1997): 82–102.
- "The Sympathetic Imagination: A Conversation with J. M. Coetzee", Eleanor Wachtel, Brick: A Literary Journal 56 (2001): 37–47.
- "A Rare Interview with a Literary Giant", Michael Shechner, Buffalo News Oct. 13, 2002, page E1.
- "An Exclusive Interview with J. M. Coetzee", David Attwell, Dagens Nyheter, Dec. 8, 2003
- "Animals, Humans, and Cruelty", Djurens Rätt, 2004
- "An Interview with J. M. Coetzee", Erik Grayson, Stirrings Still vol. 3, no. 1 (2006): 4–7.
- "All Autobiography is Autre-biography", David Atwell, in Selves in Question: Interviews on South African Auto/biography, ed. Judith Lütge Coullie et al. (Honolulu, HI: University of Hawai'i Press, 2006), 213–218.
- "The Canadian Seal Hunt: An Interview with J. M. Coetzee", The Humane Society of the United States, Mar. 14, 2008
- "Nevertheless, My Sympathies are with the Karamazovs: An Email Correspondence: May – December 2008", Arabella Kurtz, Salmagundi 166/167 (Spring 2010): 39–72.
- "An Interview with J. M. Coetzee", Lawrence Rainey, David Attwell, and Benjamin Madden, Modernism/Modernity vol. 18, no. 4 (2011): 847–853.
- "... A Certain Age ...", Lore Watterson, Classicfeel Dec/Jan (2012–13): 22–29.
- "El Nobel que quiere unir las letras del Sur", Clarín, Aug. 9, 2017

== Biography ==
- Kannemeyer, J. C. (2012). J. M. Coetzee: A Life in Writing. Johannesburg and Cape Town: Jonathan Ball. ISBN 978-1-86842-495-5.
- Attwell, David (2015). J. M. Coetzee and the Life of Writing: Face to Face with Time. New York, NY: Viking Books. ISBN 978-0-525-42961-6.

== Film and television adaptations ==
- Dust, dir. Marion Hänsel (1985). An adaptation of In the Heart of the Country.
- The Lives of Animals, dir. Alex Harvey (2002).
- De Muze / The Muse, dir. Ben van Lieshout (2007). An adaptation of Youth: Scenes from Provincial Life II.
- Disgrace, dir. Steve Jacobs (2008).
- While the above four adaptations were not written by him, Coetzee has penned screenplays for In the Heart of the Country and Waiting for the Barbarians. Though these had not been produced as of their publishing, they are in J.M. Coetzee: Two Screenplays, ed. Hermann Wittenberg (Cape Town: University of Cape Town Press, 2014) ISBN 978-1-77582-080-2
- Waiting for the Barbarians, dir. Ciro Guerra (2019). Coetzee is credited with writing the screenplay.

== Collaborations ==
- In 2012, Coetzee wrote the libretto for the opera Slow Man by Nicholas Lens, based on his novel Slow Man. The opera was given its world premiere on 5 July 2012 at the Malta Festival, Grand Theatre, Poznań
- Bruyckere, Berlinde de & J. M. Coetzee (2013). Cripplewood = Kreupelhout. Brussels: Mercatorfonds.

== Critical studies of Coetzee's work ==
Monographs

- Dovey, Teresa (1988). The Novels of J.M. Coetzee: Lacanian allegories. Johannesburg: Ad. Donker. ISBN 0-86852-132-9.
- Penner, Dick (1989). Countries of the Mind: The Fiction of J. M. Coetzee. New York, NY: Greenwood Press. ISBN 0-313-26684-0.
- Gallagher, Susan VanZanten (1991). A Story of South Africa: J.M. Coetzee's Fictions in Context. Cambridge, MA: Harvard University Press. ISBN 0-674-83972-2.
- Attwell, David (1993). J. M. Coetzee: South Africa and the Politics of Writing. Berkeley, CA: University of California Press. ISBN 0-520-07812-8.
- Kossew, Sue (1996). Pen and Power: A Post-Colonial Reading of J. M. Coetzee and André Brink. Amsterdam: Rodopi. ISBN 978-90-420-0094-0.
- Head, Dominic (1997). J. M. Coetzee. Cambridge: Cambridge University Press. ISBN 978-0-521-48232-5.
- Attridge, Derek (2004). J. M. Coetzee and the Ethics of Reading: Literature in the Event. Chicago, IL: University of Chicago Press. ISBN 978-0-226-03117-0.
- Canepari-Labib, Michela (2005). Old Myths-Modern Empires: Power, Language, and Identity in J. M. Coetzee's work. Oxford; New York, NY: Peter Lang. ISBN 0-8204-7191-7.
- Wright, Laura (2006). Writing 'out of all the camps': J. M. Coetzee's Narratives of Displacement. New York, NY: Routledge. ISBN 978-0-415-97707-4.
- Masłoń, Sławomir (2007). Père-Versions of the Truth: The Novels of J.M. Coetzee. Katowice: University of Silesia. ISBN 978-83-226-1721-2.
- Mulhall, Stephen (2008). The Wounded Animal: J. M. Coetzee and the Difficulty of Reality in Literature and Philosophy. Princeton, NJ: Princeton University Press. ISBN 978-0-691-13737-7.
- Poyner, Jane (2009). J. M. Coetzee and the Paradox of Postcolonial Authorship. Farnham; Burlington, VT: Ashgate. ISBN 978-0-7546-5462-9.
- Clarkson, Carrol (2009). J. M. Coetzee: Countervoices. Basingstoke; New York, NY: Palgrave Macmillan. ISBN 978-0-230-22156-7.
- Nashef, Hania A.M. (2009). The Politics of Humiliation in the Novels of J. M. Coetzee. New York, NY: Routledge. ISBN 978-0-415-65260-5.
- Marais, Mike (2009). Secretary of the Invisible: The Idea of Hospitality in the Fiction of J. M. Coetzee. Amsterdam: Rodopi. ISBN 978-90-420-2712-1.
- Head, Dominic (2009). The Cambridge Introduction to J.M. Coetzee. Cambridge: Cambridge University Press. ISBN 978-0-521-68709-6.
- Dooley, Gillian (2010). J. M. Coetzee and the Power of Narrative. New York: Cambria Press. ISBN 978-1-60497-673-1.
- van der Vlies, Andrew (2010). J.M. Coetzee's 'Disgrace'. New York, NY: Continuum. ISBN 978-0-8264-0661-3.
- Hayes, Patrick (2010). J. M. Coetzee and the Novel: Writing and Politics After Beckett. Oxford; New York, NY: Oxford University Press. ISBN 978-0-19-958795-7.
- Lazo Pablo, J.M. Coetzee. Los imaginarios de la Resistencia, Akal, España, 2017. ISBN 6079753774
- López, María J. (2011). Acts of Visitation: The Narrative of J. M. Coetzee. Amsterdam: Rodopi. ISBN 978-90-420-3407-5.
- MacFarlane, Elizabeth (2013). Reading Coetzee. Amsterdam: Rodopi. ISBN 978-90-420-3701-4.
- Hallemeier, Katherine (2013). J. M. Coetzee and the Limits of Cosmopolitanism. New York, NY: Palgrave MacMillan. ISBN 978-1-137-35254-5.
- Pawlicki, Marek (2013). Between Illusionism and Anti-Illusionism: Self-Reflexivity in the Chosen Novels of J. M. Coetzee. Newcastle Upon Tyne: Cambridge Scholars Publishing. ISBN 978-1-443-85304-0.
- Zimbler, Jarad (2015). J. M. Coetzee and the Politics of Style. Cambridge: Cambridge University Press. ISBN 978-1-107-04625-2.
- Crewe, Jonathan (2015). In the Middle of Nowhere: J. M. Coetzee in South Africa. Lanham, MD: University Press of America. ISBN 978-0-761-86693-0.
- Wilm, Jan (2016). The Slow Philosophy of J. M. Coetzee. London: Bloomsbury. ISBN 978-1-474-25645-2.
- Uhlmann, Anthony (2020). J. M. Coetzee: Truth, Meaning, Fiction. New York: Bloomsbury. ISBN 978-1-501-35747-3.
- Wiegandt, Kai (2020). J. M. Coetzee's Revisions of the Human: Posthumanism and Narrative Form. Cham: Palgrave Macmillan, 2020. ISBN 978-3-030-29305-5.
- Moody, Alys (2018). The Art of Hunger: Aesthetic Autonomy and the Afterlives of Modernism. Oxford: Oxford University Press. ISBN 978-0-19-882889-1
- Dean, Andrew (2021). Metafiction and the Postwar Novel: Foes, Ghosts and Faces in the Water. Oxford: Oxford University Press. ISBN 978-0-19-887140-8

Collected essays

- The Writings of J. M. Coetzee, ed. Michael Valdez Moses (Durham, NC: Duke University Press, 1994).
- Critical perspectives on J. M. Coetzee, eds. Graham Huggan and Stephen Watson (New York, NY: St. Martin's Press, 1996).
- Critical Essays on J. M. Coetzee, ed. Sue Kossew (New York, NY: G.K. Hall, 1998).
- A Universe of (Hi)stories: Essays on J. M. Coetzee, ed. Liliana Sikorska (Frankfurt am Main; New York, NY: Peter Lang, 2006).
- J. M. Coetzee and the Idea of the Public Intellectual, ed. Jane Poyner (Athens, OH: Ohio University Press, 2006).
- J. M. Coetzee: Critical Perspectives, ed. Kailash C. Baral (New Delhi: Pencraft, 2008).
- J. M. Coetzee in Context and Theory, eds. Elleke Boehmer, Katy Iddiols, and Robert Eaglestone (London; New York, NY: Continuum, 2009).
- J. M. Coetzee's Austerities, eds. Graham Bradshaw and Michael Neill (Surrey; Burlington, VT: Ashgate, 2010).
- J. M. Coetzee and Ethics: Philosophical Perspectives on Literature, eds. Anton Leist and Peter Singer (New York, NY: Columbia University Press, 2010).
- A Companion to the Works of J. M. Coetzee, eds. Tim Mehigan (Rochester: Camden House, 2011).
- Strong Opinions: J. M. Coetzee and the Authority of Contemporary fiction, eds. Chris Danta, Sue Kossew, and Julian Murphet (New York, NY: Routledge, 2011).
- Approaches to Teaching Coetzee's 'Disgrace' and Other Works, eds. Laura Wright, Jane Poyner, and Elleke Boehmer (The Modern Language Association of America, 2014).
- J. M. Coetzee’s The Childhood of Jesus: The Ethics of Ideas and Things, eds. Anthony Uhlmann and Jennifer Rutherford (London: Bloomsbury, 2017).
- Beyond the Ancient Quarrel: Literature, Philosophy, and J. M. Coetzee, eds. Patrick Hayes and Jan Wilm (Oxford: Oxford University Press, 2017).
- The Intellectual Landscape in the Works of J. M. Coetzee, eds. Tim Mehigan and Christian Moser (Columbia, MD: Boydell & Brewer, 2018).
- The Cambridge Companion to J.M. Coetzee, ed. Jarad Zimbler (Cambridge: Cambridge University Press, 2020).
