= 2003 Nobel Prize in Literature =

- John Maxwell Coetzee
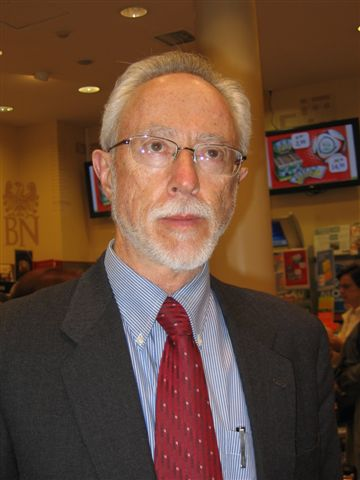
- "who in innumerable guises portrays the surprising involvement of the outsider."
- Date: 2 October 2003 (announcement); 10 December 2003 (ceremony)
- Location: Stockholm, Sweden
- Presented by: Swedish Academy
- First award: 1901
- Website: Official website

The 2003 Nobel Prize in Literature was awarded to the South African novelist John Maxwell Coetzee (born 1940), better known simply as J. M. Coetzee, "who in innumerable guises portrays the surprising involvement of the outsider." He is the fourth African writer to be so honoured and the second South African after Nadine Gordimer in 1991.

== Laureate ==
J. M. Coetzee's prose is rigorous and analytical, spanning through different genres from autobiographical novels to short fiction, essays to translations. He made his debut in 1974 with the novel Dusklands, but his international breakthrough came a few years later with Waiting for the Barbarians in 1980. A recurring theme in his novels is a crucial situation, where right and wrong are put to the test and where people's weaknesses and defeat become fundamental to the story's development. His other novels include Life & Times of Michael K (1983), Disgrace (1999), and his "Jesus" Trilogy: The Childhood of Jesus (2013), The Schooldays of Jesus, and The Death of Jesus (2019).

== Reactions ==
The Swedish Academy's decision to award Coetzee the Nobel Prize in Literature was well received in South Africa. "On behalf of the South African nation, and indeed the continent of Africa, we salute our latest Nobel laureate and bask with him in the glory radiating from this recognition", president Thabo Mbeki said. 1991 Nobel laureate Nadine Gordimer said: "It's an honour for the country, and it [gives] some indication of how South African literature has developed, particularly under the difficult conditions we have [had]."

== Nobel lecture ==
J. M. Coetzee delivered his Nobel Lecture entitled He and His Man at the Swedish Academy on December 7, 2003. His lecture features the characters of Robinson Crusoe and Daniel Defoe that borrows extensively from Defoe's A Journal of the Plague Year (1722) and A Tour thro' the Whole Island of Great Britain (1724-26) where he whimsically explores several concerns of central importance for the activities of reading and writing, most notably the seemingly unavoidable phenomenon of displacement or substitution that is best characterized as catachresis.

== Award ceremony speech ==
At the award ceremony in Stockholm on 10 December 2003, Per Wästberg of the Swedish Academy said:

The dangerous attraction of the inner self is John Coetzee’s theme: the senses and bodies of people, the interiority of Africa. “To imagine the unimaginable” is the writer’s duty. As a post-modern allegorist, Coetzee knows that novels that do not seek to mimic reality best convince us that reality exists.

Coetzee sees through the obscene poses and false pomp of history, lending voice to the silenced and the despised. Restrained but stubborn, he defends the ethical value of poetry, literature and imagination. Without them, we blinker ourselves and become bureaucrats of the soul. (...)

In the dystopian novel Disgrace, David Lurie does not achieve creativity and freedom until, stripped of all dignity, he is afflicted by his own shame and history’s disgrace. In this work, Coetzee summarises his themes: race and gender, ownership and violence, and the moral and political complicity of everyone in that borderland where the languages of liberation and reconciliation carry no meaning.

Every new book by Coetzee is astonishingly unlike his others. He intrudes into the uninhabited spaces of his readers. In his autobiographies, he pitilessly ransacks his former selves. In his essay-novel Elizabeth Costello he combines, with uninhibited humour and irony, contemporary narrative and myth, philosophy and gossip.
