= List of South African Nobel laureates and nominees =

The Nobel Prizes were established according to the will of the Swedish industrialist and inventor, Alfred Nobel and are awarded to individuals who have excelled in the fields of chemistry, physics, physiology or medicine, literature, economics and peace. Since 1951, eleven South African-born individuals have been awarded.

== Laureates ==
| Year | Image | Laureate | Born | Died | Field | Citation |
|---|---|---|---|---|---|---|
Citizens
| 1951 | | Max Theiler | 30 January 1899; Pretoria, Gauteng, South Africa | 11 August 1972; New Haven, Connecticut, United States | Physiology or Medicine | "for his discoveries concerning yellow fever and how to combat it." |
| 1960 | | Albert Luthuli (Note: Albert Luthuli received his Nobel Prize one year later, in 1961. During the selection process in 1960, the Norwegian Nobel Committee decided that none of the year's nominations met the criteria as outlined in the will of Alfred Nobel. According to the Nobel Foundation's statutes, the Nobel Prize can in such a case be reserved until the following year, and this statute was then applied. Luthuli therefore received his Nobel Prize for 1960 one year later, in 1961.) | c. 1898; Bulawayo, Zimbabwe | 27 July 1967; KwaDukuza, KwaZulu-Natal, South Africa | Peace | "for his non-violent struggle against apartheid." |
| 1979 | | Allan MacLeod Cormack | 23 February 1924; Johannesburg, Gauteng, South Africa | 7 May 1998; Winchester, Massachusetts, United States | Physiology or Medicine | "for the development of computer assisted tomography." (awarded together with Godfrey Hounsfield) |
| 1984 | | Desmond Tutu | 7 October 1931; Klerksdorp, North West, South Africa | 26 December 2021; Cape Town, South Africa | Peace | "for his role as a unifying leader figure in the non-violent campaign to resolve the problem of apartheid in South Africa." |
| 1991 | | Nadine Gordimer | 20 November 1923; Springs, Gauteng, South Africa | 13 July 2014; Johannesburg, Gauteng, South Africa | Literature | "who through her magnificent epic writing has - in the words of Alfred Nobel - been of very great benefit to humanity." |
| 1993 | | Nelson Mandela | 18 July 1918; Mvezo, OR Tambo, Eastern Cape, South Africa | 5 December 2013; Houghton Estate, Johannesburg, Gauteng, South Africa | Peace | "for their work for the peaceful termination of the apartheid regime, and for laying the foundations for a new democratic South Africa." |
| 1993 | | Frederik Willem de Klerk | 18 March 1936; Johannesburg, Gauteng, South Africa | 11 November 2021; Cape Town, South Africa | Peace | "for their work for the peaceful termination of the apartheid regime, and for laying the foundations for a new democratic South Africa." |
| 2002 | | Sydney Brenner | 13 January 1927; Germiston, Transvaal, South Africa | 5 April 2019; Singapore | Physiology or Medicine | "for their discoveries concerning genetic regulation of organ development and programmed cell death." (awarded together with H. Robert Horvitz and John E. Sulston) |
| 2003 | | John Maxwell Coetzee (Note: On 2002, Coetzee moved to Australia but he was still awarded the Nobel Prize in Literature as a South African citizen. Then, on 6 March 2006, he became a full Australian citizen.) | 9 February 1940; Cape Town, South Africa | —N/a | Literature | "who in innumerable guises portrays the surprising involvement of the outsider." |
| 2013 | | Michael Levitt | 9 May 1947; Pretoria, Gauteng, South Africa | —N/a | Chemistry | "for the development of multiscale models for complex chemical systems." (awarded together with Martin Karplus and Arieh Warshel) |
| 2026 | | Navi Pillay | 23 September 1941; Durban, KwaZulu-Natal, South Africa | —N/a | Peace | "for her efforts to promote peace and international law." |
Expatriates
| 1982 | | Aaron Klug (Note: Aaron Klug was born in Lithuania to Jewish parents with whom he emigrated to South Africa at the age of two. He received his secondary and tertiary education at the Durban High School and University of the Witwatersrand in Johannesburg respectively. He studied physics and obtained his Master of Science degree at the University of Cape Town.) | 11 August 1926; Želva, Ukmergė, Lithuania | 20 November 2018; Cambridge, United Kingdom | Chemistry | "for his development of crystallographic electron microscopy and his structural elucidation of biologically important nucleic acid-protein complexes." |

=== Members of laureate organizations ===
The following South African-based organizations and individuals were significant members who contributed largely in making a larger organization become a Nobel laureate.

| Year | Image | Individual/ organization | Born | Died | Laureate organization | Citation |
|---|---|---|---|---|---|---|
| 1963 | | South African Red Cross Society (SARCS) | founded in 1921 in Cape Town, South Africa | | League of Red Cross Societies (with International Committee of the Red Cross (ICRC)) | "for promoting the principles of the Geneva Convention and cooperation with the U.N." |
| 1965 | | UNICEF South Africa | founded in 1946 in Pretoria, Gauteng, South Africa | | United Nations Children's Fund (UNICEF) | "for its effort to enhance solidarity between nations and reduce the difference between rich and poor states" |
| 2007 | | Debra Roberts (Note: Debra C. Roberts was one of the six co-chairs of the Intergovernmental Panel on Climate Change when it won the 2007 Peace Prize with U.S. Vice President Al Gore.) | 13 January 1961; Harare, Zimbabwe | —N/a | Intergovernmental Panel on Climate Change (IPCC) (with Al Gore (b. 1948)) | "for their efforts to build up and disseminate greater knowledge about man-made climate change, and to lay the foundations for the measures that are needed to counteract such change." |

== Nominations ==
The first South African nominee for the Nobel Prize was a certain P. B. de Ville who was unsuccessfully recommended twice (in 1930 and 1932) by South African Minister of Health and Social Welfare Karl Bremer (1885–1953). Since then, other South African influential figures and organizations started receiving nominations as well. The following list are the nominees with verified nominations from the Nobel Committee and recognized international organizations. There are also other purported nominees whose nominations are yet to be verified since the archives are revealed 50 years after, among them:

- For Physics: Tikvah Alper (1909–1995), Mike Pentz (1924–1995), Friedel Sellschop (1930–2002), Frank Nabarro (1916–2006), Stanley Mandelstam (1928–2016), Jan H van der Merwe (1922–2016) and George F. R. Ellis (born 1939).
- For Physiology or Medicine: Christiaan Barnard (1922–2001) and Phillip Tobias (1925–2012).
- For Literature: Mary Renault (1905–1983), Laurens van der Post (1906–1996), Es'kia Mphahlele (1919–2008), Dan Jacobson (1929–2014), André Brink (1935–2015), Peter Abrahams (1919–2017), Karel Schoeman (1939–2017), Wilbur Smith (1933–2021), Athol Fugard (1932–2025), Breyten Breytenbach (1939–2024), Sindiwe Magona (born 1943), Zoë Wicomb (born 1948), Zakes Mda (born 1948), Antjie Krog (born 1952), Ivan Vladislavic (born 1957), Gcina Mhlophe (born 1958) and Damon Galgut (born 1963).
- For Peace: Oliver Tambo (1917–1993), Walter Sisulu (1912–2003), Fatima Meer (1928–2010), Thabo Mbeki (born 1942), Nkosazana Dlamini-Zuma (born 1949), African National Congress (founded in 1912), International Defence and Aid Fund (founded in 1956) and Centre for Human Rights (founded in 1986).

=== Nominees ===
| Image | Nominee | Born | Died | Years Nominated | Citation | Nominator(s) |
|---|---|---|---|---|---|---|
Physics
| | Johannes Frederik ("Hannes") de Beer | 1930 | | 1966 (Note: J. Fr. de Beer was nominated jointly with J.W.Keuffel, T.E.Cranshaw, S.Miyamoto and Shuji Fukui the only time.) | "for the development of the spark chamber" | Yozo Nogami (1918-2008) from University of Tokyo; Japan |
Chemistry
| | John Bockris | 5 January 1923 in Johannesburg, Gauteng, South Africa | 7 July 2013 in Gainesville, Florida, United States | 1970 (Note: J. Bockris was nominated jointly with Herbert Spencer Harned (1888–1969) and Walter Houser Brattain (1902–1987) for the 1970 Nobel Prize in Chemistry. Brattain was subsequently awarded the 1956 Nobel Prize in Physics.) | "for his research on the first model of the electrode-electrolyte surface that include the dipole moment of the solvent." | T. M. Salem (?); Egypt |
Physiology or Medicine
| | Joseph Gillman | 3 December 1907 in Pretoria, South Africa | 5 September 1981 in Nice, Alpes-Maritimes, France | 1953 | "for their contributions in addressing malnutrition and pellagra in South Africa." | E. H. Cluver (?) South Africa; O. S. Heyns (?) South Africa; Raymond Dart (1893–1988) South Africa |
| | Theodore Gillman | c. 1917 in South Africa | 12 July 1971 in Durban, KwaZulu-Natal, South Africa | 1953 | "for their contributions in addressing malnutrition and pellagra in South Africa." | E. H. Cluver (?) South Africa; O. S. Heyns (?) South Africa; Raymond Dart (1893–1988) South Africa |
Literature
| | J. R. R. Tolkien | 3 January 1892 in Bloemfontein, Free State, South Africa | 2 September 1973 in Bournemouth, Hampshire, England | 1961 | The Hobbit (1937); The Lord of the Rings (1954–1955); The Adventures of Tom Bombadil (1962); The Road Goes Ever On (1967) | C. S. Lewis (1898–1963); United Kingdom |
| | J. R. R. Tolkien | 3 January 1892 in Bloemfontein, Free State, South Africa | 2 September 1973 in Bournemouth, Hampshire, England | 1967 | The Hobbit (1937); The Lord of the Rings (1954–1955); The Adventures of Tom Bombadil (1962); The Road Goes Ever On (1967) | Gösta Holm (1916–2011); Sweden |
| | J. R. R. Tolkien | 3 January 1892 in Bloemfontein, Free State, South Africa | 2 September 1973 in Bournemouth, Hampshire, England | 1969 | The Hobbit (1937); The Lord of the Rings (1954–1955); The Adventures of Tom Bombadil (1962); The Road Goes Ever On (1967) | Richard E. Wycherley (1909–1986); United Kingdom |
| | Nadine Gordimer | 20 November 1923 in Springs, Gauteng, South Africa | 13 July 2014 in Johannesburg, Gauteng, South Africa | 1972, 1973 | A World of Strangers (1958); The Conservationist (1974); Burger's Daughter (1979); July's People (1981) | Artur Lundkvist (1906–1991); Sweden |
| | Alan Paton | 11 January 1903 in Pietermaritzburg, KwaZulu-Natal, South Africa | 12 April 1988 in Botha's Hill, KwaZulu-Natal, South Africa | 1972 | Cry, The Beloved Country (1948); Too Late the Phalarope (1953); Tales from a Troubled Land (1961); Ah, but Your Land Is Beautiful (1983) | Astley Cooper Partridge ( 1901–?); South Africa |
Peace
| | P. B. de Ville | ? South Africa | ? South Africa | 1930, 1932 | | Karl Bremer (1885–1953); South Africa |
| | Jan Smuts | 24 May 1870 in Riebeek West, Swartland, Western Cape, South Africa | 11 September 1950 in Irene, Gauteng, South Africa | 1945 | "for his efforts to end World War II and for South Africa's main role in the war of helping the allies in preventing Germany and Italy from conquering North Africa." | Halvdan Koht (1873–1965); Norway |
| | Marcus [Mordechai Aryeh] Wald | 1 June 1901 in Cluj-Napoca, Romania | 12 March 1957 in Johannesburg, Gauteng, South Africa | 1949 | "for his book on Jewish comprehensions of the peace problem." | D. L. Smit (?); South Africa |
| | Helen Suzman | 7 November 1917 in Germiston, Transvaal, South Africa | 1 January 2009 in Johannesburg, Gauteng, South Africa | 1972 | | Richard Luyt (1915–1994); South Africa |
| | Stephen Biko | 18 December 1946 in Tarkastad, Eastern Cape, South Africa | 12 September 1977 in Pretoria, Gauteng, South Africa | 1978 | | American Friends Service Committee |
| | Beyers Naudé | 10 May 1915 in Roodepoort, Gauteng, South Africa | 7 September 2004 in Johannesburg, South Africa | 1993 | "for his role in the dismantling of apartheid, as fighter for human rights, and prophet and humane pastor to all who suffered under apartheid." | American Friends Service Committee |
| | Zackie Achmat | 21 March 1962 in Vrededorp, Gauteng, South Africa | —N/a | 2004 | "for having helped to galvanize a global movement to provide hope and gain access to treatment for those with HIV and AIDS." | American Friends Service Committee |
| | Treatment Action Campaign | founded in 1998 in Cape Town, South Africa | | 2004 | "for having helped to galvanize a global movement to provide hope and gain access to treatment for those with HIV and AIDS." | American Friends Service Committee |
| | 14 South African women (part of the 1000 PeaceWomen) (Note: The 14 South African women who formed part in the 1000 PeaceWomen were Adelle Ptgieter (b. 1974), Busisiwe Virginia Hlomuka (1965–2005), Cordelia Nozukile Tshaka (b. 1951), Daphne Jansen (b. 1956), Edith Matshikiza (b. 1943), Jenet Dlamini (b. 1967), Lesley Ann Foster (b. 1967), Lorna Philander (b. 1960), Mirriam Malala (b. 1936), Nikiwe Nyamakazi (b. 1958), Nosandla Malindi (b. 1960), Regina Makunga (b. 1950), Rolene Miller (b. 1938) and Veronica Khosa (b. 1927).) | began in 2003 in Bern, Switzerland | | 2005 | "in recognition of women's efforts and visibility in promoting peace all over the world." | Ruth-Gaby Vermont-Mangold (born 1941); Switzerland |
| | Elon Musk | 28 June 1971 in Pretoria, Transvaal, South Africa | —N/a | 2024 | "for his adamant defense of dialogue, free speech and [enabling] the possibility to express one’s views in a continuously more polarized world." | Marius Nilsen (born 1984) |
