= The Pole and Other Stories =

2023 book by J. M. Coetzee

- 1st US edition
- Author: J. M. Coetzee
- Language: English
- Publisher: Liveright
- Publication date: 19 September 2023
- Publication place: United States
- Media type: Print (Hardcover)
- Pages: 176
- ISBN: 9781324093862
- OCLC: 1398511342
- Preceded by: The Death of Jesus

The Pole and Other Stories is a 2023 book by J. M. Coetzee. In the United Kingdom, Australia, and Canada it was published as the novella "The Pole" along with five stories that were written over the previous two decades.

In the United States it was published as a stand-alone novel, titled The Pole, and did not include the five "appended" stories.

== Brief summary ==
The novel (or novella) The Pole centres around a Polish pianist, 72 year-old Witold Walczykiewicz, who is invited to Barcelona, Spain, to perform. There he meets middle-aged Beatriz, with whom he begins to correspond after returning to Poland. Witold eventually travels to Mallorca, where Beatriz's husband has a summer home, to be with her.

All but one of the additional five stories collected alongside "The Pole" (in some published editions), centre around the character of Elizabeth Costello, a character who has appeared before in Coetzee's work and is sometimes described as Coetzee’s own alter ego. The four Elizabeth Costello stories are: "As a Woman Grows Older", "The Old Woman and the Cats", "The Glass Abattoir", and "Hope". The fifth story, "The Dog", first appeared in a December 2017 issue of The New Yorker. The stories (except "Hope") were also published in a 2018 Spanish translation of Coetzee's stories titled Siete Cuentos Morales (Seven Moral Tales)."

== Publication history ==
The Pole was first published in 2022 in a Spanish translation by Mariana Dimópoulos under the title El Polaco by the Argentinian publisher El Hilo de Ariadna. This was Coetzee's third book whose initial publication was in the Southern Hemisphere. Coetzee explained that this was deliberate on his part because "the symbolism of publishing in the South before the North is important to me".

The Pole was also his second novel to originally appear in Spanish translation. Coetzee says the Spanish translation of the novel provides a more accurate portrayal of his objectives than the English. An English edition was published in July 2023.
