= Slow Man (opera) =

2014 opera by Nicholas Lens

- Opera by Nicholas Lens
- Librettist: J. M. Coetzee
- Premiere: 24 October 2014; Grand Theatre, Poznań

Slow Man is an opera by Nicholas Lens to an English-language libretto by J. M. Coetzee, based on his 2005 novel of the same name. The opera was commissioned by the Malta Festival, Poznań and produced by the Opera Poznań.

It is the first time author and Nobel Prize winner Coetzee has collaborated on a stage adaptation of his work.

Although the operatic version differs from the original story, Slow Man is a contemporary opera that arouses deep emotions among each of the original main characters: Paul Rayment, Elizabeth Costello and Marijana. The opera is centered on a meeting arranged by Elizabeth Costello (the writer) between Paul Rayment, a man of late middle-age with an amputated leg and the blind Marijana. The meeting has not only a strong sexual connotation but themes as love, isolation, old age, and fear of demise are prevalent.

J. Roszak in Biweekly described Slow Man as a ‘high risk opera’ but also as 'an important operatic work'.

== First performances ==
The opera was given its world premiere on 5 July 2012 at Opera Poznań Grand Theatre, Poznań. The Grand Theatre Orchestra and Chorus was conducted by Bassem Akiki. The staging by Maja Kleczewska has been described as 'a subtle treatment of words and sounds with suggestive film footage by Wojciech Pus'. The set design was by Katarzyna Borkowska and the opera poster illustration was the painting The Advantage by Michael Borremans.

== Roles ==
Role	Voice type	Premiere cast, 5 July 2012 (conductor: Bassem Akiki)
Elisabeth Costello	mezzo-soprano	Lani Poulson
Paul Rayment	bass/baritone	Mark S. Doss
Marijana	coloratura soprano	Claron McFadden
The People, The Mass, The Nurses, chorus

== Instrumentation ==
The singers perform with an orchestra consisting of 2 flutes (one doubling on piccolo and one doubling on alto flute), one english horn, 3 clarinets (one bass clarinet), three bassoons (one bass bassoon), two horns, two trumpets (one flugelhorn), three trombones (one bass trombone), four percussions (including timpani), harp, piano and strings. The work also requires a three-part female chorus.

== Dramaturgy ==
- I. Pain is nothing: Senza misura- Tempo comodo con una tensione latente e molto misterioso - Adagio con un sentimento inquieto - Pesante ma non troppo - Rassegnazione ma con una tensione latente - Tempo comodo con un sentimento inquieto - Attaco di sorpresa! Caos totale - Adagio con un sentimento inquieto - Piu Pesante e Furioso
- II. My name is Elisabeth Costello: Con ritmo tranquillo - Cantabile drammatico - Danza assurda - Con grazia regale molto solenne
- III. I felt sad: Largo con desiderio di morte - Con una grande tensione latente -
- IV. I will be with you a while yet: Quasi Grave ma con una grande tensione latente
- V. Do you remember the woman?: Con ritmo leggiero - Deciso, furioso, quasi alla marcia - Con ritmo tranquillo quasi come un reggae jamaicano
- VI. Marianna is quite a woman: Danza energica assurda furiosa - Molto selvaggio et clownesco - Lento doloroso
- VII. A blind woman: Largo con un sentimento inquieto
- VIII. I will be a model guest: Andante macabro - Adagio grave - Allargando ma con una grande tensione latente - Adagio grave
- IX. Danza protrusiva macabra: Intenso con una grande tensione latente - Agitato e con tono aggressivo
- X. Marianna, I know that is your name: Meno mosso ma con una tensione latente
- XI. The danza of the halt and the blind: Meno mosso
- XII. She said that you were lonely: Andante con una tensione latente - Rispettoso ma con un sentimento inquieto -Andante con una tensione latente
- XIII. Coïtus with a stranger: Adagio grave - Lento doloroso
- XIV. What did she tell her?: Quasi alla marcia e lugubre
- XV. There was something: Largo con un sentimento inquieto
- XVI. Should I abandon you?: Largo con desiderio di morte (solemne e misterioso)
- XVII. Such a small fish: Andante maestoso - Grave ma con un sentimento inquieto - Caoticamente
- XIX. Someone to close our eyes for us: Con tristezza poetica - Liberamente - Molto violente e spaventoso - Liberamente(a bene placido)
