= The Childhood of Jesus =

2013 novel by J. M. Coetzee

- First edition hardcover
- Author: J. M. Coetzee
- Language: English
- Genre: Novel
- Publisher: Text Publishing (Australia); Jonathan Cape; Viking Press (U.S. edition)
- Publication date: 7 March 2013 (Australia & UK); 3 September 2013 (U.S.)
- Pages: 288
- ISBN: 9780670014651
- OCLC: 2013016960
- Followed by: The Schooldays of Jesus

The Childhood of Jesus is a 2013 novel by South African-born Australian Nobel laureate J. M. Coetzee.

== Synopsis ==
The book follows a man and a boy who emigrate to a new land. Once there, they receive new names and rough estimates of their age and are taught Spanish to help them acclimatise to their new surroundings. Simón, the elder of the two, begins working at a grain wharf and slowly befriends his fellow workers. At the same time, Simón must find a way to locate the mother of the young boy David, who remembers nothing about her but assumes that he will recognize her when he sees her. During a walk, Simon sees a woman he believes is David's mother, and he subsequently talks her into assuming the role. However, while she begins to care for David, the authorities insist that he be sent to a distant school. Refusing to give him up, Simón and the woman flee in hopes of outrunning their pursuers and retaining custody of David.

== Publication ==
The book was published simultaneously on 7 March 2013, by Jonathan Cape (UK) and Text Publishing (Australia). The U.S. edition was published on 3 September 2013, by Viking. It was also published in Spanish translation, partly because it relates to Coetzee's interest in Argentine literature and resisting what he calls the "hegemony of the English language".

== Reception ==
Tim Adams of The Observer believed it to be "an early contender for an unprecedented third Booker prize".

The Australian also praised The Childhood of Jesus, stating that it was "a masterpiece".

Theo Tait, writing in The Guardian, said that The Childhood of Jesus was "richly enigmatic, with regular flashes of Coetzee's piercing intelligence" and compared the book to the rest of what he termed Coetzee's "admirable but forbidding canon". Tait wrote, "Personally, I would put The Childhood of Jesus some distance behind his conspicuous masterpieces, such as Life & Times of Michael K, Waiting for the Barbarians and Disgrace, and also behind the wonderful autobiographical trilogy that ended with Summertime". Nevertheless, said Tait, The Childhood of Jesus "probably belongs in the strange-but-interesting section, with his Crusoe story Foe and Elizabeth Costello."

Upon its U.S. publication, David Ulin, the Los Angeles Times book critic, said it "ultimately falls prey to the emptiness it describes. Partly, this has to do with its meandering quality; in a land without history, even those who seek not to forget must lose sight of the past. But even more, the issue is the distance in Coetzee's writing, the feeling that his characters are less living flesh-and-blood than signifiers of some idea. When his novels are working (as in Life and Times of Michael K. or the magnificent Waiting for the Barbarians), Coetzee's ideas are big enough to seize us, to give us a new set of lenses on the world. With The Childhood of Jesus, however, the allegory never extends beyond itself, beyond the image of a small group of wanderers, adrift in an uncharted universe, "looking for somewhere to stay".

Anthony Uhlmann, in the Sydney Review of Books, discussed ways in which the novel could be understood as part of a dialogue with the works of Gerald Murnane.
