= White Writing =

Collection of essays by J. M. Coetzee

First (1988) edition Cover artist: Thomas William Bowler, Graham's Town from the Bay Road, 1865

White Writing: On the Culture of Letters in South Africa is a collection of essays by Nobel-laureate J. M. Coetzee, originally published in 1988, and in 2007 was reprinted, with a new introduction, by Pentz Publishers (ISBN 9780980270006).

"Since it first appeared in 1988, JM Coetzee's first volume of criticism has emerged as an indispensable reference in the study of South African literature. In the seven essays comprising the collection, he reads a range of texts, in various genres, which represent the endeavours of white writers to come to terms with the South African landscape and their tenuous place within it. The seven essays concern a wide range of works written in both English and Afrikaans, including the nineteenth-century travel writing of William Burchell, which compares the landscapes of England and South Africa, always to the latter's detriment, is discussed in relation to subsequent engagements by Thomas Pringle, WEG Louw, WC Scully and Roy Campbell. In addition to landscape, land ownership and pastoralist ideologies, the studies address the versions of race developed, implicitly or explicitly, in writings by authors as diverse as Pauline Smith, Mikro, Alan Paton and Gertrude Millin."

John Maxwell Coetzee is an author and academic from South Africa. He became an Australian citizen in 2006 after relocating there in 2002. A novelist and literary critic as well as a translator, Coetzee has won the Booker Prize twice and was awarded the 2003 Nobel Prize in Literature.

== Another use of the term "White Writing" ==
White writing is also a term used to describe the abstract artworks of visual artist Mark Tobey (1890-1976), "Mark Tobey was a leading painter of the Northwest School, one of the four "Northwest Mystics" described in a 1953 Life magazine article that proclaimed the "Mystic Painters of the Pacific Northwest." Tobey became renowned for an energetic, Eastern influenced "white writing" style of abstraction painted originally to express the frenetic pulse of New York City, a style which influenced Jackson Pollock among others. "
