= Dust (1985 film) =

- French theatrical release poster
- Directed by: Marion Hänsel
- Screenplay by: Marion Hänsel
- Based on: In the Heart of the Country by J. M. Coetzee
- Produced by: Jean Daskalidès; Jacques Dubrulle; Marion Hänsel; Jean-François Lepetit
- Starring: Jane Birkin; Trevor Howard; John Matshikiza; Nadine Uwampa; Lourdes Cristina Boho Sayo
- Cinematography: Walther Vanden Ende
- Edited by: Susana Rossberg
- Music by: Martin St. Pierre
- Production companies: Man's Films; Daska Films; Flach Films; FR3 Films Production; Ministère de la Communauté française de Belgique; Ministerie van de Vlaamse Gemeenschap
- Distributed by: 20th Century Fox France
- Release date: 11 September 1985 (TIFF)
- Running time: 88 minutes
- Countries: Belgium; France
- Language: English

Dust is a 1985 drama film directed by Marion Hänsel based on the 1977 J. M. Coetzee novel In the Heart of the Country. The film was shot in Spain and is a French-Belgian production. The film was selected as the Belgian entry for the Best Foreign Language Film at the 58th Academy Awards, but was not accepted as a nominee. It won the Silver Lion prize, awarded to the best first or second major work by a director, at the 1985 Venice Film Festival. The jury recognised Jane Birkin's performance as amongst the best of the year, but decided not to award a best actress prize because all of the actresses they judged to have made the best performances were in films that won major awards.

== See also ==
- List of submissions to the 58th Academy Awards for Best Foreign Language Film
- List of Belgian submissions for the Academy Award for Best Foreign Language Film
