= Foe (Coetzee novel) =

1986 novel by J. M. Coetzee

- First edition
- Author: J. M. Coetzee
- Language: English
- Publisher: Viking Press
- Publication date: 1986
- Publication place: South Africa
- Media type: Print (hardcover)
- Pages: 157 pp (hardcover edition)
- ISBN: 0-670-81398-2 (hardcover edition)
- OCLC: 14098832
- Dewey Decimal: 823.914
- LC Class: PR9369.3.C58 F6 1987

Foe is a 1986 novel by South African-born Nobel laureate J. M. Coetzee. Woven around the existing plot of Robinson Crusoe, Foe is written from the perspective of Susan Barton, a castaway who landed on the same island inhabited by "Cruso" and Friday as their adventures were already underway. Like Robinson Crusoe, it is a frame story, unfolded as Barton's narrative while in England attempting to convince the writer Daniel Foe to help transform her tale into popular fiction. Focused primarily on themes of language and power, the novel was the subject of criticism in South Africa, where it was regarded as politically irrelevant on its release. Coetzee revisited the composition of Robinson Crusoe in 2003 in his Nobel Prize acceptance speech.

== Plot ==
Susan Barton is on a quest to find her kidnapped daughter who she knows has been taken to the New World. She is set adrift during a mutiny on a ship to Lisbon. When she comes ashore, she finds Friday and Cruso who has grown complacent, content to forget his past and live his life on the island with Friday—tongueless by what Cruso claims to have been the act of former slave owners—in attendance. Arriving near the end of their residence, Barton is on the island for only a year before the trio is rescued, but the homesick Cruso does not survive the voyage to England. In England with Friday, Barton attempts to set her adventures on the island to paper, but she feels her efforts lack popular appeal. She tries to convince novelist Daniel Foe to help with her manuscript, but he does not agree on which of her adventures is interesting. Foe would prefer to set her story of the island as one episode of a more formulaic story of a mother looking for her lost daughter, and when he does write the story she wishes, fabulates about Cruso's adventures rather than relating her facts. Frustrating Barton's efforts further, Foe, who becomes her lover, is preoccupied with debt and has little time or energy to write about anything. Barton's story takes a twist with the return of someone claiming to be her missing daughter.

== Themes ==
Analysts of the book have primarily focused on themes of power and language use, particularly as it relates to marginalized people. In 1994 Patrick McGrath of The New York Times claimed that one of Coetzee's central themes throughout his body of work is the "linkage of language and power, the idea that those without voices cease to signify, figuratively and literally"; McGrath pointed to Foe as the "most explicit expression" of that theme. Barton longs to tell her own story, but lacks the language to do so in a way that the public will accept. The agent she chooses to help give her the words necessary to communicate persists in erasing her history, by minimizing what she perceives as important and supplanting her remembered facts with adventurous fiction. As Foe takes over her tale, McGrath said, Barton "loses her voice in history, and thus her identity."

In addition to trying to preserve herself and her history, Barton is attempting to give voice to the even more graphically silenced Friday. Denis Donoghue of New York University stated that "the political parable [of the novel] issues from Friday's tonguelessness", as one of the central themes of the novel is the imperative to give voice to the oppressed. Barton sees Friday as caught on the edge of birth by his speechlessness, though she believes that his desire for liberation is explicit, if unspoken; Foe – though wondering if those who are not speechless "are secretly grateful" for the opportunity to project their thoughts onto Friday – believes that Friday could overcome his speechlessness by learning to write. While the book depicts the struggle to control text, Donoghue concludes that the undefined narrator of the book's finale (which Sam Durrant in "J. M. Coetzee, Elizabeth Costello and the Limits of the Sympathetic Imagination" pointed out could only have been written after the deaths of Barton and Defoe) is "the voice of the poetic imagination, its sympathies expanding beyond all systems to reach the defeated, the silenced…" Friday is afforded a final opportunity to tell his story, but can only communicate through the release of bubbles from his waterlogged corpse, a communication which neither the narrator nor the reader can interpret.

David Attwell in J.M. Coetzee: South Africa and the Politics of Writing saw this inability of a silenced black character to communicate as central to the book, indicating that "Friday's enforced silence represents what a monocultural, metropolitan discourse cannot hear". South African writer Rian Malan also felt the racial gap was key, describing Foe as "the most profound book ever written about race relations in a society where whites were often separated from blacks by an abyss of linguistic and cultural incomprehension." When Malan interviewed Coetzee for Time magazine, he questioned the writer about this theme, who only replied, "I would not wish to deny you your reading." Professor Manju Jaidka of Panjab University, Chandigarh noted that Barton, as a woman in a very masculine text, in herself represents "the minority, the marginalised, or the silenced other." Jane Poyner in J.M. Coetzee and the Idea of the Public Intellectual highlighted the inherent tension in Barton's role, as she simultaneously struggles against the efforts of Foe to appropriate and misrepresent her story and unintentionally "'colonizes' Friday's story" herself as she interprets his silence.

== Critical reception ==
Foe attracted criticism in South Africa upon its publication. According to Michael Marais in "Death and the Space of the Response of the Other in J.M. Coetzee's The Master of Petersburg", Foe met "acrimony, even dismay" at the time of its publication, as one of South Africa's "most prominent authors" seemed to turn his attention from compelling events in South Africa to "writing about the writing of a somewhat pedestrian eighteenth century novelist." In detailing that receipt, Marais quotes Michael Chapman in "Writing of Politics" as typical with his dismissive comment: "In our knowledge of the human suffering on our own doorstep of thousands of detainees who are denied recourse to the rule of law, Foe does not so much speak to Africa as provide a kind of masturbatory release, in this country, for the Europeanising dreams of an intellectual coterie" Attwell, however, noted in 2003 that the novel is contextualized to Africa by the transformation of Friday from a Carib who looked nearly European to an African.

In the United States, reception was less politically charged. The novel received a positive review in The New York Times, where Michiko Kakutani praised the writing as "lucid and precise; the landscape depicted, mythic yet specific", concluding that "the novel - which remains somewhat solipsistically concerned with literature and its consequences - lacks the fierceness and moral resonance of Waiting for the Barbarians and Life and Times of Michael K, and yet it stands, nonetheless, as a finely honed testament to its author's intelligence, imagination and skill." Andrew O'Hehir for Salon described the novel as "a bit dry". In his review for Time, Stefan Kanfer questions the impact of what he describes as an "achingly symbolic retelling", suggesting that readers may be more self-congratulatory for discovering the author's "brilliantly disguised" themes than moved by "urgencies that are neither fresh nor illumined."

== Nobel acceptance speech ==
When Coetzee was awarded the 2003 Nobel Prize in Literature, he revisited the theme of composition as self-definition in his acceptance speech, entitled "He and his Man". Coetzee, who had lectured in character before, narrated a situation in which an elderly Crusoe quietly living in Bristol becomes the ambivalent muse of Defoe. According to The Guardian, this act of composition "write[s] Defoe into existence, rather than the other way around." Although Crusoe is the narrator of the piece, Coetzee indicated that he did not know whether Crusoe or Defoe represented him in the lecture. By contrast, he clearly identified himself with Barton in Foe: "the unsuccessful author—worse, authoress".

== Sources ==
- Attwell, David (1993). J. M. Coetzee: South Africa and the Politics of Writing. University of California Press. ISBN 0-520-07812-8.
- Marais, Michael (2006). "Death and the Space of the Response of the Other in J. M. Coetzee's The Master of St. Petersburg". In Poyner, Jane (ed.). J. M. Coetzee and the Idea of the Public Intellectual. Ohio University Press. pp. 83–99. ISBN 0-8214-1686-3.
