= The Master of Petersburg =

1994 novel by J. M. Coetzee

- First edition
- Author: J. M. Coetzee
- Language: English
- Publisher: Secker & Warburg
- Publication date: 1 November 1994
- Publication place: South Africa
- Media type: Print (paperback)(hardback)
- Pages: 256pp (hardback)
- ISBN: 0-09-947037-3
- OCLC: 59264366

The Master of Petersburg is a 1994 novel by South African writer J. M. Coetzee. The novel is a work of fiction but features the Russian writer Fyodor Dostoyevsky as its protagonist. It is a deep, complex work that draws on the life of Dostoyevsky, the life of the author and the history of Russia to produce profoundly disturbing results.

It won the 1995 Irish Times International Fiction Prize.

== Synopsis ==
The novel begins with Dostoyevsky arriving in Saint Petersburg to collect the belongings of his recently deceased stepson Pavel. Arriving at the flat where Pavel lodged with a widow named Anna Sergeyevna Kolenkina and her young daughter, Matryona, Dostoyevsky discovers that his stepson's personal belongings have been confiscated by the police. Informed by the police that his stepson was an associate of the notorious political agitator Sergey Nechayev, Dostoyevsky finds himself under secret police surveillance.

Remaining in Petersburg to wait for the release of his stepson's diaries, letters and other writings from the police, Dostoyevsky finds himself entering into an affair with Anna Sergeyevna. Whilst the police continue to investigate his stepson's death, Dostoyevsky is contacted by Nechayev who takes him to the spot where Pavel's body was found and tells Dostoyevsky that the police were behind his death. Dostoyevsky, suspecting that Nechayev is manipulating the truth, refuses to author a political pamphlet accusing the police of killing his stepson and instead writes a short pamphlet that states his suspicion that Nechayev and his followers were behind Pavel's death. To his horror, Dostoyevsky realises this is what Nechayev wanted him to do all along, in order to incite the city's students against establishment figures such as Dostoyevsky. As the university students riot and set fire to the city, Dostoyevsky sits down and begins to write a fictionalised account of events.

== Historical background ==
Hanging over the novel is a scene from Coetzee's own life: the death of his son at 23 in a falling accident. Dostoyevsky is found at the start of the novel trying to accept the death of his stepson Pavel, which occurs in a similar manner. Though Pavel is based on a real person, his death is fictional – the real Pavel outlived Dostoyevsky.

The antagonist in the book, who shares many conversations with Dostoyevsky, is Sergey Nechayev, real-life leader of the Nechaevists, a clandestine group of Nihilist terrorists. The murder in the novel is comparable to an actual murder committed by the Nechaevists in 1869, as is the scene of the crime – a cellar containing a printing press used by Nechaev. The same murder was the background for Dostoevsky's novel Demons, published in 1871–72.

== Reception ==
Initial reception to the novel was mixed. Writing in The Independent, Jan Daley described the book as "more admirable than enjoyable" and "without the pulsing immediacy of Coetzee's previous work".

Patrick McGrath, writing for The New York Times, concluded that the novel was "dense and difficult, a novel that frustrates at every turn" and without "any clear narrative resolution".

== Awards ==
- 1995 Irish Times International Fiction Prize
