= In the Heart of the Country =

1977 novel by J. M. Coetzee

- First US edition
- Author: J. M. Coetzee
- Language: English
- Publisher: Harper & Row (US); Secker & Warburg (UK)
- Publication date: 1977
- Publication place: South Africa
- Media type: Print (Hardback & Paperback)
- Pages: 139
- ISBN: 0-09-946594-9
- OCLC: 56467689

In the Heart of the Country (1977) is an early novel by South African-born writer J. M. Coetzee. The book is one of Coetzee's more experimental novels and is narrated through 266 numbered paragraphs rather than chapters.

== Plot ==
The novel is narrated from the point of view of Magda, the white daughter of a widowed farmer in the Karoo semi-desert of the Western Cape. Much of the novel is narrated from within the claustrophobic confines of Magda's bedroom and throughout the narrative the unreliability of Magda's narration means the reader cannot be certain what is actually taking place and what is occurring within Magda's imagination. At the beginning of the novel Magda fantasizes about her father unexpectedly bringing home a young bride and the violent way that she would kill them both. A short while later the black farm worker Hendrik really does bring a young bride named Anna to the farm. Magda's father seduces Anna and when Magda hears her father and Anna fornicating in the farmhouse bedroom, she takes her father's rifle and shoots him in the stomach. He slowly dies of his injuries and Magda buries him in a makeshift crypt on the farmland. Gradually, without her father to manage the land, the food begins to run out and Hendrik, who is owed wages, demands to be paid. Magda pays him in kind by offering him certain items from her father's former possessions. Hendrik and Anna move into the farmhouse and the power balance begins to tip in their favour. After a series of altercations, Hendrik rapes Magda and begins to visit her room every night for sexual intercourse. When white men from nearby farms turn up looking for Magda's father, Hendrik and Anna flee fearing that they will blamed for his death. The novel ends with Magda isolated on the farm, slowly starving and seemingly going mad, as she tries to communicate with the planes that are beginning to fly over the desert every day.

== Development history ==
Coetzee has stated that the 'brief sequences' that narrate the novel are fundamentally influenced by filmic and photographic modes of representation. He cites Chris Marker's La Jetée and Andrzej Munk's Passenger as particular influences. Moreover, Coetzee explains that the numbered paragraphs should act like film scenes in that they point to 'what is not there between them'.

There are three versions of the novel in existence: the 1977 British version, the 1977 American version which was the same but published under the title From The Heart Of The Country, and the 1978 South African version. In the South African version the novel's dialogue is in Afrikaans.

== Awards and nominations ==
The novel was awarded the 1977 CNA Prize.

== Adaptations ==
Marion Hänsel directed a motion picture adaptation, Dust, in 1985.
