= Age of Iron =

Book by John Maxwell Coetzee

- Cover of the first UK edition
- Author: J. M. Coetzee
- Language: English
- Publisher: Martin Secker and Warburg (UK); Random House (US)
- Publication date: September 1990
- Publication place: London, England (UK); New York City, New York (US)
- Media type: Print (hardback, paperback)
- Pages: 181 (UK); 198 (US)
- ISBN: 978-0-394-58859-9
- OCLC: 945777923

Age of Iron is a novel by South African Nobel Prize winner J. M. Coetzee written between 1986 and 1989, and first published in 1990. It is among his most popular works and was the 1990 Sunday Express Book of the Year. In it, he paints a picture of social and political tragedy unfolding in a country ravaged by racism and violence. Critically acclaimed, it remains one of the most striking pieces of literature regarding South African apartheid and is still used in schools worldwide for literature studies.

== Plot summary ==
This story is narrated in a letter from Mrs. Curren, the main character and a retired Classics professor, to her daughter who has previously left South Africa and migrated to the United States to make a clear stand against apartheid. Mrs. Curren lives in Cape Town during the Apartheid regime. She's just been told by her doctors that her bone cancer is incurable and that she's going to die soon. Returning home, she discovers a homeless man, Vercueil, is camped out near her house. She tells him to leave, but after he comes back again, Mrs. Curren gives him food and offers him work, which seems to offend him. Later that evening, she spots the man staring at the TV through her window. Needless to say she's annoyed. In the night, however, she has a sudden painful attack, and the man helps her. They form a sort of weird friendship as Vercueil spends most of his time near her house. One day she asks him to mail a letter to her daughter. He takes a long time to agree, but eventually he mails the letter.

Mrs. Curren's housekeeper, Florence, returns from a trip and brings her two daughters and her son Bheki with her. Mrs. Curren resents having Bheki in the house, but he has no other place to go. His friend, who Mrs. Curren thinks is a hoodlum, gets into a fight with Vercueil, who disappears for a bit. Around this time, policemen start hanging out near the house, apparently keeping tabs on Bheki and his friends. Tensions are rising. When Vercueil returns, he brings home a woman and they both pass out drunk in the living room. Overwhelmed with people, Mrs. Curren starts to feel that everyone is conspiring against her to take over her property before she even dies.

One day Mrs. Curren witnesses the same cops who previously talked to her disrespectfully, force Bheki and his friend, John, who are on bikes, to run into a truck. John injures his head badly, and she sits in the street holding his head until the ambulance arrives. Previously insulated from racial hatred, Mrs. Cullen starts to realize that her neat little white world doesn't match the reality of police brutality against black people. She wants to demand justice from the authorities for John's injury, but Florence won't let her because she's afraid to be involved with the police. They all go to the hospital to visit Bheki's friend, but Vercueil and Mrs. Curren wait in the car because she's in too much pain. Brought to tears, she admits to him that she hasn't told her daughter about her impending death. He encourages her to tell the truth, so her daughter doesn't resent her after she's gone. At home that night, Mrs. Curren invites Vercueil to sleep on the couch. She catches herself wishing he lives there.

Tragedy strikes again when Florence gets a phone call in the middle of the night saying her son is in trouble. Mrs. Curren drives Florence and her daughter to Gugulethu, an unsafe place, where they meet Mr. Thabane, Florence's cousin. They drive to a part of town in chaos - fire, screaming people, and dead bodies. Faced with so much destruction and fear, Mrs. Curren essentially throws a fit and is put to shame about her privileged sensibility by Mr. Thabane who lectures her about the true meaning of comradeship. Eventually they find Bheki. He and four other black men have been murdered and left lying against a wall, their eyes and mouths full of sand. Horrified, Mrs. Curren finds a policeman and demands he do something, but he brushes her off. The next day, some women come by to pick up Florence's things, as she won't return.

After all of that, Vercueil asks Mrs. Curren if she intends to kill herself that day. She says yes, so they go for a drive. She's unable to go through with it however, so Vercueil buys some liquor and tells her to get drunk. Offended, she screams at him to leave, which he does. He stays away for a while. One night Mrs. Curren wakes up to find John asking about Bheki. She tells him that his friend is dead, but the boy doesn't seem to understand. He's injured, so she looks after him for a bit. When she finds him stashing something in the floorboards one day, she calls Mr. Thabane to take John away.

The next morning the police come to her house asking about John. She says that everything is fine, but John is afraid. Promising not to let anything hurt him, she tries to comfort him. In a cruel trick, an officer distracts Mrs. Curren and the others shoot John. The cops then say she can return to her home, but she can't stand the thought of it. She wanders the streets until she falls asleep under a bridge. Waking to kids groping her, she's robbed and in excruciating pain. Somehow Vercueil finds her, but she still refuses to go home. They fall asleep in the woods together before returning the next day. Her house has been trashed, and a policeman is there who interrogates her about John and Vercueil. After he leaves, she calls Mr. Thabane to warn him.

From this point on, Mrs. Curren fades quickly as the cancer progresses. Her pain gets worse, and she has bizarre nightmares. Vercueil, who is caring for her now, repeatedly encourages her to commit suicide. They start sharing a bed so that she can stay warm. Their relationship is completely platonic; she just can't stay warm any more. When she wakes up extremely cold one day, she asks Vercueil if today is the day. Without a word, he climbs into bed and embraces her. Her final words are that he can't make her any warmer.

== Structure and genre ==
Mrs. Curren is the first-person narrator in an epistolary style. Since she addresses her daughter in her letters as "you" the reader feels directly addressed. Coetzee's novel can be interpreted as a coming-of-age novel since it is about Mrs. Curren's perspective on the world and coming to terms with that. Therefore, coming-of-age is in this case not growing older but rather about development.

The title is not about the Iron Age but iron represents the rough and brutal way of life Mrs. Curren and the people in Cape Town live in. The first part where the term Age of Iron comes up is:

Children of iron, I thought. Florence herself, too, not unlike iron. The age of iron. After which comes the age of bronze. How long, how long before the softer ages return in their cycle, the age of clay, the age of earth? A Spartan matron iron-hearted, bearing warrior sons for the nation [...]

Mrs. Curren does indeed think that the brutality is not something a handful of people partakes in but is a very big part in the nature of the people in Cape Town. However, she does underline that just like every other era in history, this time of brutality and racism will eventually come to an end.

Coetzee brings together important themes in this book: aging, death, the confessor as hero, narrative representation, the meaning of freedom, the unity of man, familial relationships and the position of the white liberal in Apartheid South Africa.
