= Slow Man =

2005 novel by J. M. Coetzee

- First edition
- Author: J. M. Coetzee
- Language: English
- Publisher: Secker & Warburg
- Publication date: 1 September 2005
- Publication place: Australia
- Media type: Print (Hardback & Paperback)
- Pages: 272pp (UK hardback)
- ISBN: 0-436-20611-0
- OCLC: 61431359

Slow Man is a novel by the South-African writer J.M. Coetzee and concerns a man who must learn to adapt after losing a leg in a road accident. The novel has many varied themes, including the nature of care, the relationship between an author and his characters, and man's drive to leave a legacy. It was Coetzee's first novel since winning the Nobel Prize in Literature in 2003. The novel was longlisted for the 2005 Man Booker Prize.

== Characters ==
- Paul Rayment, a French expatriate in his sixties now living in Adelaide, who at the beginning of the novel has his right leg amputated above the knee after a bicycle accident. He is a photographer by profession who has no children of his own and no ties to his homeland or his adopted country, except a collection of 19th-century Australian photographs.
- Elizabeth Costello, an aging Australian writer famous for her early novel The House on Eccles Street, which re-tells James Joyce's Ulysses from the perspective of the protagonist's wife, Molly Bloom. She appears on Paul's doorstep about one-third into the novel and begins interfering with his life by setting him up on a 'blind' date with a woman he glimpsed at the hospital. It is also heavily implied throughout the novel that he is a character in a book she is writing. Costello is the eponymous protagonist of Coetzee's previous novel.
- Marijana Jokic, a paid nurse who cares for Paul at his home and becomes the object of his affections and desires. Her family are refugees from Croatia.
- Drago Jokic, Marijana's sixteen-year-old son, whom Paul looks upon as the son he never had.

== Plot summary ==
Paul Rayment, a man of late middle-age, loses part of a leg after his bicycle is hit by a car driven by a reckless young man. He becomes reclusive and retreats to his flat where he is cared for by a succession of nurses. None suit him until Marijana, with whom he shares a European childhood (hers in Croatia, his in France), comes along. Paul's feelings for Marijana, and for her teenage son Drago, become more complex. When Paul offers to finance Drago's education, Marijana's husband becomes suspicious of Paul's relationship with Marijana, which causes trouble in their family and culminates in Drago fighting with his father and moving in with Paul.

It is not until the famed author Elizabeth Costello shows up unexpectedly and uninvited at Paul's doorstep that he confronts his feelings for Marijana and his resentment at the state of his life following his bicycle accident. Costello's sudden presence in his life confounds Paul, who believes she is merely using him as a character in her next novel.

The book can be read as a metafictional discourse on the inter-relationship between the literary author and the characters, and with reality.

== Slow Man, the opera ==
Slow Man, an operatic adaption of Slow Man by the composer Nicholas Lens, in close co-operation with Coetzee who wrote the libretto, had its world premiere on 5 July 2012 by the Malta Festival 2012 in Poznań, with the Opera Poznań Grand Theatre Wielki.

== Reviews ==
- Review from MysteryInk
- Review from The Guardian
