= Diary of a Bad Year =

2007 book by J. M. Coetzee

- First edition
- Author: J. M. Coetzee
- Language: English
- Publisher: Text Publishing
- Publication date: 3 September 2007
- Publication place: Australia
- Media type: Print
- Pages: 304pp
- ISBN: 1-921145-63-3
- OCLC: 174094405

Diary of a Bad Year is a book by South African-born Nobel laureate J. M. Coetzee. It was released by Text Publishing in Australia on 3 September 2007, in the United Kingdom by Harvill Secker (an imprint of Random House) on 6 September, and in the United States on 27 December.

== Plot summary ==
The protagonist, called Señor C. by the other characters, is an ageing South African writer living in Sydney, Australia. The novel consists of his essays and musings alongside diary entries by both Señor C. and Anya, a neighbour whom he has hired as a typist. The essays, which take up the larger part of each page, are on wide-ranging topics, including the politics of George W. Bush, Tony Blair, Guantánamo Bay, and terrorism. The diary entries appear beneath the essays and describe the relationship that develops between the two characters, a relationship that ultimately leads to subtle evolutions in both their worldviews.

== Awards and nominations ==
- New South Wales Premier's Literary Awards, Christina Stead Prize for Fiction, 2008: shortlisted
- The Age Book of the Year Award, Fiction Prize, 2008: shortlisted
- Victorian Premier's Literary Award, The Vance Palmer Prize for Fiction, 2008: shortlisted
- Queensland Premier's Literary Awards, Best Fiction Book, 2008: shortlisted
- Australia-Asia Literary Award, 2008: longlisted

== Extracts ==
- Extract from The New York Review of Books
- Extract from The Guardian

== Reviews ==
- Riemer, Andrew (24 August 2007). "Diary of a Bad Year". The Sydney Morning Herald.
- Mukherjee, Neel (1 September 2007). "Diary of a Bad Year". The Times. London. Archived from the original on 6 July 2008.
- Gee, Maggie (2 September 2007). "Diary of a Bad Year". The Sunday Times. London. Archived from the original on 18 July 2008.
- Cartwright, Justin (2 September 2007). "Diary of a Bad Year, by J M Coetzee". The Independent. Archived from the original on 6 January 2009.
- Sen, Aveek (4 October 2007). "Señor C - At the gateway to oblivion". The Telegraph. Archived from the original on 13 June 2008.
