= Manju Jaidka =

Indian academic

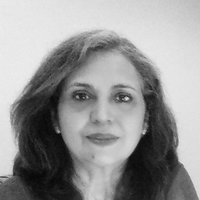
- Born: Haryana, India
- Occupations: Professor (superannuated), novelist, poet, critic
- Employer: Retired

Manju Jaidka is an Indian author, known for her contribution to American Studies in India and for compiling important reference books like the Encyclopedias of Indian Writing in English and Diasporic Indian English writing published by Routledge and Springer respectively. She has contributed critical works that are widely acknowledged as standard references.

She served a chairperson and professor at Panjab University, in Chandigarh, India and as a President of MELOW (The Society for the Study of the Multi-Ethnic Literatures of the World).

== Books ==
- Jaidka, Manju. "The Legend of Sanjhi Giri," Rhyvers Press, 2025. ISBN 978-8197008399
- Jaidka, Manju, Tej N.Dhar, and Natasha Vashisht, 2025. Encyclopedic Dictionary of Diasporic Indian English Writing. Springer. https://link.springer.com/referencework/10.1007/978-981-96-0045-8
- Jaidka, Manju; Dhar, Tej N. (2023). The Routledge Encyclopedia of Indian Writing in English. Routledge. ISBN 978-1-032-24557-7.
- When Cato Played Cupid and Other Stories. Petals Publishers, 2022.
- Gumshoe Mania: A Novel. Vishwakarma Publishing House, November 2021.
- Covid’s Metamorphosis: Stories from our Corona Times. Amazon Kindle publication, Sept 2020.
- Saudade. Poetry collection. Sapatrishi Publications, Chandigarh. December 2019.
- Amaltas Avenue: A Novel. New Delhi: Lifi Publishers, June 2014.
- For Reasons Unknown. Poetry anthology. Allahabad: Cyberwit. Jan 2013.
- Scandal Point: A Novel. New Delhi: Rupa Publishers. Dec 2011.
- Spots of Time: A Novel. Chandigarh: Graphit India. Oct 2007
- The Seduction and Betrayal of Cat Whiskers: An Academic Satire. Chandigarh: Graphit India. Oct 2007. Rpt Jan 2013.
- Ed. Vignettes: Anthology of Short Stories by Women (translated from Hindi) for Sahitya Akademi, Delhi. 2018.
- The Next Milestone Nov 2016 (on management of disability). Print edition, March 2017.
- Essays on American Literature: Signposts and Landmarks. Arun Publishing House, Chandigarh. January 2021.
- Narratives Across Borders. Cambridge Scholars, 2016.
- Deepa Mehta's Elemental Trilogy. New Delhi: Readworthy Press, July 2011.
- Landmarks in American Literature. New Delhi:Prestige Press, 2007.
- Politics of Location in the Multi-Ethnic Literatures of the Americas, co-edited with Anil Raina (Chandigarh: Arun Publishing House, 2003).
- An Annotated Anthology of English and American Poetry (University Grants Commission Text Book Award). Chandigarh: Panjab University Publication Bureau, 2002.
- Cross-Cultural Transactions in Multi-Ethnic Literatures of America, eds. Anil Raina, Manju Jaidka, Somdatta Mandal and Vijay Kumar Sharma. New Delhi:Prestige Press, 2002
- From Slant to Straight: Recent Trends in Women's Poetry. New Delhi: Prestige Publishers, 2000.
- T. S. Eliot's Use of Popular Sources (Mellen Press, US, 1997). This was her Post-Doctoral Fulbright project for which research was carried out at the Houghton (Harvard University, Cambridge, MA), Beinecke (Yale), Harry Ramson Centre (Austin, Texas), and New York Public Library.
- Tiresias and Other Masks: English and American Poetry after The Waste Land. Chandigarh: Arun Publishing House, 1994.
- Confession and Beyond: The Poetry of Sylvia Plath. Chandigarh: Arun Publishing House, 1992.

== Awards and honours ==
- 2016: Award for Lifetime Contribution to Literature from Chandigarh Sahitya Akademi.
- 2008, The Lillian Robinson Fellowship by the Simone de Beauvoir Institute for Feminist Studies, Concordia University.
- 2011-13: Associate Scholar, Indian Institute of Advances Study, Shimla,
- 2008: Award for Creative Excellence by First Friday Forum, Chandigarh
- 1998-99: International Fellowship, Rockefeller Foundation, at the International Forum for US Studies, University of Iowa.
- 1996, April–May: Fellowship, Salzburg Seminar Workshop on “Themes in Contemporary American Literature” (April 1996) sponsored by USIA, Washington.
- 1995, September–October: Resident Fellowship, Bellagio Study and Conference Center, Italy. (sponsored by the Rockefeller Foundation)
- 1991-92: Post-Doctoral Fulbright Research Grant, Harvard and Yale Universities, USA. (sponsored by USEFI)
- 1994: Awarded University Grants Commission Text Book Grant.
- 1991 March: Olive I. Reddick (Sr.) Award for the best literature paper presented at the annual conference of the Indian Association for American Studies, Bombay.
- 1989 August: William Mulder Research Grant from ASRC, Hyderabad.
