= Dusklands =

1974 debut novel by J. M. Coetzee

- First edition (South Africa)
- Author: J. M. Coetzee
- Language: English
- Publisher: Ravan Press (SA); Secker and Warburg (UK)
- Publication date: 18 April 1974
- Publication place: South Africa
- Media type: Print
- ISBN: 0-86975-035-6
- OCLC: 39714684

Dusklands (1974) is the debut novel by J. M. Coetzee, winner of the 2003 Nobel Prize in Literature. The novel consists of two thematically linked novellas, "The Vietnam Project" and "The Narrative of Jacobus Coetzee."

== Plot ==
The first novella, "The Vietnam Project", relates the gradual descent into insanity of its protagonist Eugene Dawn. Eugene works for a U.S. government agency responsible for the psychological warfare in the Vietnam War. However, his work on mythography and psychological operations is taking a heavy toll on him; his fall culminates in him stabbing his own son, Martin.

The second novella, "The Narrative of Jacobus Coetzee", which takes place in the 18th century, is an account of a hunting expedition into the then "unexplored" interior of South Africa. After crossing the Orange River, Jacobus meets with a Nama tribe to trade, but suddenly falls ill. He is attended to by the tribe and gradually recovers, only to get into a fight for which he is expelled from the village. His last slave dying on the way home, he returns alone and later organises a punitive expedition against the Nama. The narrative concludes with his execution of the slaves that deserted him on the previous journey and the massacre of the tribe.

== Development history ==
Coetzee began working on the novel whilst he lived in London. He would visit the British Museum and research accounts of early explorers and travellers within South Africa. When he moved to Texas in the late 1960s he continued to research the subject, but still had not begun writing. Coetzee began writing the novel when he moved to Buffalo, New York, in January 1970. The novel stemmed out of a New Year's resolution to "stop thinking and planning and actually start writing".

== Reception ==
According to the literary critic Dominic Head, who has published two book-length studies on Coetzee, "it has become a truism in criticism of Coetzee that Dusklands introduces a new postmodernist strain in the novel from South Africa." From the time of its initial publication in 1974, it has generally garnered positive responses from readers and critics, many of whom admire its presentation and critique of the violence inherent in the colonialist and imperialist mentality of the Western world. On the other hand, those who've "found fault with Dusklands have tended to concentrate on the obliquity of the book's method: Coetzee is condemned for failing to offer a more direct rejection of the colonial violence he represents."

When Per Wästberg delivered the Presentation Speech at the 2003 Nobel Prize award ceremony, he singled out Dusklands in his talk:

The myth of the survivor on a desert island is the only story there is, J. M. Coetzee once said. Several of his books treat similar solitudes. Is it possible to stand outside history? Does freedom from the diktat of authority exist? "I don't like accomplices. God, let me be alone," says [the protagonist] Jacobus Coetzee in the first novel, Dusklands, rejoicing in being abandoned. But he remains the tool of history, and what compels the natives to take him seriously is his victorious violence. He does, however, ask himself whether the blacks populate a wonderful world closed to his own senses: "Perhaps I have killed something of inestimable value."

== Popular culture ==
Dusklands is seen in the movie G.I. Jane, being read by Command Master Chief John James Urgayle (portrayed by actor Viggo Mortensen).
