= The Death of Jesus =

2019 novel by J. M. Coetzee

- First English edition (publ. Text Publishing)
- Author: J. M. Coetzee
- Original title: La muerte de Jesús
- Language: English
- Publisher: Text Publishing (Australia)
- Publication date: 1 October 2019
- Pages: 197
- ISBN: 9781922268280 Hardcover
- Preceded by: The Schooldays of Jesus

The Death of Jesus is a 2019 novel by J. M. Coetzee.

== Background and publication ==
Prior to its publication, The Death of Jesus was cited in media across the world as one of the most anticipated novels of 2020 in the English-speaking world.

The Death of Jesus is the third in Coetzee's "Jesus" trilogy, following The Childhood of Jesus (2013) and The Schooldays of Jesus (2016). It was first published in Spanish under the title La muerte de Jesús in Argentina and distributed throughout Latin America. It is the second of Coetzee's books to appear first in Spanish, the first being Siete cuentos morales or Seven Moral Tales

== Reception and reviews ==
It has been reviewed extensively, including by:

- Australian Book Review
- The Standard
- Financial Times
- The Guardian
- The Times
