= The Schooldays of Jesus =

2016 novel by J. M. Coetzee

- First edition
- Author: J. M. Coetzee
- Language: English
- Genre: Fiction
- Publisher: Text Publishing (Australia); Harvill Secker (UK)
- Publication date: February 2016 (Australia); 18 August 2016 (UK)
- Media type: Print (Hardback)
- ISBN: 9781911215356
- OCLC: 959234400
- Preceded by: The Childhood of Jesus
- Followed by: The Death of Jesus

The Schooldays of Jesus is a 2016 novel by J. M. Coetzee. In July 2016, it was longlisted for the 2016 Man Booker Prize.

== Background and publication ==
It is Coetzee's 13th novel and is a sequel to the 2013 novel The Childhood of Jesus. It was published in Australia in February 2016 and in the UK in August 2016.

It was also published in Spanish translation, partly because it relates to Coetzee's interest in Argentine literature and resisting what he calls the "hegemony of the English language", and Chinese, and in ebook, audiobook, and Braille editions.

== Synopsis ==
It resumes the story of a young boy named David, who appears in The Childhood of Jesus, who is brought up in a foreign land.

== Awards ==
- 2016: Longlisted, Man Booker Prize
