= Elizabeth Costello =

2003 novel by J. M. Coetzee

- Author: J. M. Coetzee
- Language: English
- Genre: Fiction, Literature
- Publisher: Secker & Warburg
- Publication date: 30 September 2003
- Publication place: Australia
- Media type: Print (Hardback), (Paperback)
- Pages: 224pp
- ISBN: 0-436-20616-1
- OCLC: 52456771

Elizabeth Costello is a 2003 novel by South African-born Nobel Laureate J. M. Coetzee.

In this novel, Elizabeth Costello, a celebrated aging Australian writer, travels around the world and gives lectures on topics including the lives of animals and literary censorship. In her youth, Costello wrote The House on Eccles Street, a novel that re-tells James Joyce's Ulysses from the perspective of the protagonist's wife, Molly Bloom. Costello, becoming weary from old age, confronts her fame, which seems further and further removed from who she has become, and struggles with issues of belief, vegetarianism, sexuality, language and evil. Many of the lectures Costello gives are edited fragments that Coetzee had previously published. The lessons she delivers only tenuously speak to the work for which she is being honored. Of note, Elizabeth Costello is the main character in Coetzee's academic novel, The Lives of Animals (1999). A character named Elizabeth Costello also appears in Coetzee's 2005 novel Slow Man and Coetzee's 2011 short story Lies is about a woman with the last name Costello.

== Summary ==
Elizabeth Costello is a sixty-six-year-old renowned author so devoted to her writing that she often neglects not only her own needs but also those of her children. Due to the fact that her first novel is about women's liberation, her interviewers, usually other women, are disappointed to find that she isn't an avid fighter for equality, who eagerly discusses the importance of a woman's role in modern society.

Accompanied by her son John, she travels to Pennsylvania to receive the Stowe Award. During her acceptance speech, she speaks about Kafka and the audience finds it difficult to follow her idea, for this kind of talk is not to their liking. It seems that there is a gap between her and her audience. Although public speaking becomes a challenge for her, she decides to take a cruise in which she is supposed to speak about realism. The applause she gets is unenthusiastic.

Not only does the public not understand what she wants them to realize, but neither does her own family. Elizabeth's vegetarianism often provokes quarrels between her and her daughter-in-law. Her son is torn between love for his mother and difficulties in accepting her point of view. More often than not, he asks himself why she can't be just like any other elderly woman. The truth is that she doesn't know the answer herself. She speaks about the things people don't want to know, because she feels the need to do it.

Elizabeth has a sister she hasn't seen for a long period of time. She lives in Africa and serves in the Marian Order. The sisters have very little in common. During a graduation ceremony that both sisters are invited to, Blanche criticizes the humanities. Their parting is bitter, for they know they will not see each other again. Blanche charges Elizabeth with choosing "the wrong Greeks", meaning that Blanche doesn't support the philosophical ideas her sister is so fond of.

At the end of the novel, Elizabeth finds herself in a kind of limbo, which she can only escape by satisfactorily explaining her beliefs before a court. It's implied this is a purgatory-like stage of the afterlife. Her first attempt is a failure, for she tells the truth and states that she doesn't believe in anything. She then has another try, where she tells a fictional story that reveals a deeper appreciation of life, but the novel ends before she finds out whether she will succeed at passing through the gate.

== Background philosophy ==
Elizabeth Costello frequently engages philosophers and their ideas. Among the philosophers mentioned by name are historical figures such as Aristotle, Porphyry, Augustine, Thomas Aquinas, René Descartes and Jeremy Bentham, as well as contemporary figures such as Mary Midgley, Tom Regan and Thomas Nagel. In addition two minor characters, Elaine Marx and an academic named Arendt (whose first name is not mentioned) share surnames with the famous philosophers Karl Marx and Hannah Arendt. The frequent allusions to philosophers have caused critics to debate whether there are philosophical themes in Coetzee's work and, if so, what they might be.

Part of the debate has focused on similarities between ideas expressed by Coetzee's protagonist and the philosophy of Mary Midgley. Coetzee's protagonist for example is concerned with the moral status of animals, a subject Midgley addressed in her 1983 book Animals and Why They Matter. Midgley has also criticized Marx and other philosophers for singling out one human attribute (in Marx's case, that of freely given labour) and proclaiming it to be the unique quality that elevates human life above that of animals. Midgley argues that this approach confuses a factual claim and a moral claim, and it has been suggested that Elizabeth Costello draws attention to the same shortcoming in Arendt. As one analysis of Elizabeth Costello puts it, “The problem with Marx’s view is that there are human activities in which people find considerable value, such as giving birth, that are capacities we share with animals. Similarly, there are some actions, such as committing suicide, that may be unique to human beings yet that we do not celebrate. Like Marx, Hannah Arendt lauds one particular human attribute, in her case our capacity to take part in a shared world of political speech and action, on the grounds that it is what separates us from animals. There is a certain casual brilliance in the way Coetzee extends Midgley’s critique of Marx to Arendt, whose philosophy is often thought to invert Marxism.”

== Is this the gate? (chamber opera) ==
The chamber opera Is this the gate? by the Belgian composer Nicholas Lens with libretto by J.M. Coetzee is based on the last chapter of the novel (first performance at the Adelaide Festival 2024, Australia). After Slow Man (opera), the chamber opera Is this the gate? is the second co-operation between the opera composer Nicholas Lens and J.M. Coetzee.

A music-theatre piece, The Blessing, is a collaboration between Coetzee and Australian composer, Andrew Ford. It is based on a scene from Elizabeth Costello. Scored for mezzo-soprano and oboe, it was first performed at the Coriole Music Festival in May 2022, by Elizabeth Campbell and Celia Craig,

== Distinctions ==
- 2003 longlisted for the Man Booker Prize
- 2004 shortlisted for the Miles Franklin Award
