= J. M. Coetzee =

South African and Australian writer (born 1940)

J. M. Coetzee OMG AC FRSL
- Coetzee in 2026
- Born: John Maxwell Coetzee; 9 February 1940 (age 86); Cape Town, South Africa
- Citizenship: South Africa; Australia (since 2006)
- Education: University of Cape Town (BA, MA); University of Texas at Austin (PhD)
- Occupations: Novelist; essayist; translator
- Works: Full list
- Spouse: Philippa Jubber (m. 1963; div. 1980)
- Partner: Dorothy Driver (1980–present)
- Children: 2
- Awards: Booker Prize (1983, 1999); Nobel Prize in Literature (2003)

John Maxwell Coetzee (Note: While Coetzee is pronounced [kutˈsiə] in modern Afrikaans, Coetzee himself pronounces it [kutˈseː]. Consequently, the BBC Pronunciation Unit recommends the English approximation /kʊtˈsiː/ kuut-SEE based on his pronunciation.) (born 9 February 1940) is a South African and Australian novelist, essayist, and translator. The recipient of the 2003 Nobel Prize in Literature, Coetzee is one of the most critically acclaimed and decorated authors in the English language. He has won the Booker Prize (twice), the Central News Agency Literary Award (thrice), the Jerusalem Prize, the Prix Femina étranger, and The Irish Times International Fiction Prize, and holds a number of other awards and honorary doctorates.

Coetzee moved to Australia in 2002 and became an Australian citizen in 2006. He lives in Adelaide, South Australia. He is patron of the J. M. Coetzee Centre for Creative Practice at the University of Adelaide. His most recently published book is The Pole and Other Stories (2023).

== Early life and education ==
John Maxwell Coetzee was born on 9 February 1940 in Cape Town, in what was then the Union of South Africa. His father, Zacharias Coetzee, was an occasional attorney and government employee, and his mother, Vera Coetzee (née Wehmeyer), was a schoolteacher. His father was often absent, and enlisted in the army and fought in World War II to avoid being prosecuted on a criminal charge. Vera and her children relied on financial and other support from relatives. The family mainly spoke English at home, but Coetzee spoke Afrikaans with other relatives.

Coetzee is descended from 17th-century Dutch immigrants to South Africa on his father's side and from Dutch, German, and Polish immigrants through his mother. His mother's grandfather was a Pole, born Balcer Dubiel in 1844 in the village of Czarnylas (Schwarzwald), in a part of Poland annexed by Prussia. Coetzee's ancestry caused a lifelong preoccupation with Polish literature and culture, culminating in his 2022 novel The Pole.

Coetzee spent most of his early life in Cape Town and in Worcester, a town in the Cape Province (modern-day Western Cape), as recounted in his fictionalised 1997 memoir Boyhood. His family moved to Worcester when he was eight, after his father lost his government job. Coetzee attended St. Joseph's College, a Catholic school in the Cape Town suburb Rondebosch. He studied mathematics and English at the University of Cape Town (UCT), receiving a Bachelor of Arts with honours in English in 1960 and a Bachelor of Arts with honours in mathematics in 1961.

Coetzee moved to the United Kingdom in 1962 and worked as a computer programmer for IBM in London and ICT (International Computers and Tabulators) in Bracknell, staying until 1965. His experiences in England are recounted in Youth (2002), his second volume of fictionalised memoirs.

In 1963, the University of Cape Town awarded Coetzee a Master of Arts degree for his thesis The Works of Ford Madox Ford with Particular Reference to the Novels (1963).

== Academia ==
=== United States ===
In 1965, Coetzee went to the University of Texas at Austin (Note: Many sources say that Coetzee went as a Fulbright scholar, but he has said this is not so, and Fulbright alumni searches here and here bear this out. Nor is he listed on the U.S. Bureau of Educational and Cultural Affairs's list of Fulbright alumni who have won the Nobel Prize. His bio in the 2012 edition of Diary of a Bad Year simply says "Between 1965 and 1968 Coetzee studied at the University of Texas".) in the United States and enrolled in bibliography and Old English courses. While there, he taught students at the university, and also wrote a paper on the morphology of the Nama, Malay, and Dutch languages for linguist Archibald A. Hill, who taught at the university. His PhD dissertation was a computer-aided stylistic analysis of the English prose of Samuel Beckett. After leaving Texas in 1968, he was awarded his doctorate in 1969.

In 1968, Coetzee began teaching English literature at the State University of New York at Buffalo, where he stayed until 1971. At Buffalo, he began his first novel, Dusklands.

From as early as 1968, Coetzee sought permanent residence in the U.S., a process that was finally unsuccessful, in part due to his involvement in protests against the war in Vietnam. In March 1970, he was one of 45 faculty members who occupied the university's Hayes Hall and were arrested for criminal trespass. The charges against them were dropped in 1971.

Coetzee was on the faculty of the University of Chicago's Committee on Social Thought until 2003.

=== University of Cape Town ===
In 1972, Coetzee returned to South Africa and was appointed lecturer in the Department of English Language and Literature at the University of Cape Town. He was promoted to senior lecturer and associate professor before becoming Professor of General Literature in 1984. In 1994, Coetzee became Arderne Professor in English, and in 1999 he was appointed Distinguished Professor in the Faculty of Humanities. Upon retirement in 2002, he was awarded emeritus status.

=== Adelaide ===
After relocating to Adelaide, Australia, Coetzee was made an honorary research fellow at the English Department of the University of Adelaide, where his partner, Dorothy Driver, is a fellow academic. As of November 2023, Coetzee is listed as University Professorial Research Fellow within the School of Humanities.

== Writing career ==
Coetzee's first novel was Dusklands (1974), and he has published a novel about every three years since. He has also written autobiographical novels, short fiction, translations from Dutch and Afrikaans, and numerous essays and works of criticism. His latest work is The Pole and Other Stories (2023). He has not written a novel set in South Africa since 2009.

According to James Meek, writing in The Guardian in 2009: "Since Disgrace, the nature of Coetzee's project has changed. He has moved away from naturalistic, storytelling fiction towards other forms—essays, polemic and memoir, or a composite of all three in a fictional framework... [he] seems to be taking less interest in the storytelling keel of his books and is inviting us instead to listen in to an intimate conversation he is having with himself, in the form of multiple alter egos". These alter egos include a character type represented by the magistrate in Waiting for the Barbarians and David Lurie in Disgrace; another is a female proxy for himself, the "elderly, scholarly, world-weary novelist" Elizabeth Costello, a recurring character in his works; and the last is Coetzee himself, writing autobiographically. Meek also remarks that Coetzee is harsh on himself, in the characters who represent him in some ways.

Relating to his developing interest in Argentine literature in the 2010s, Coetzee's trilogy of novels The Childhood of Jesus, The Schooldays of Jesus, and The Death of Jesus reflect his preoccupation with and evolution of his ideas and views on language ("I do not like the way in which English is taking over the world... I don't like the arrogance that this situation breeds in its native speakers. Therefore, I do what little I can to resist the hegemony of the English language"). All three were translated into Spanish, with the last published in Spanish translation first. He also became involved with the Literatures of the South project during this period (2015).

The Pole was first published in Spanish as El polaco, in Argentina, in 2022, and in English the next year.

== Awards, recognition, appearances ==
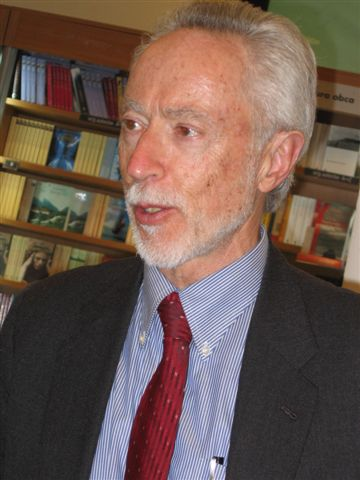
Coetzee in Warsaw (2006)

Coetzee is one of the most critically acclaimed and decorated authors in the English language. He has received numerous awards throughout his career, although he has a reputation for avoiding award ceremonies.

=== 1983 and 1999 Booker Prizes ===
Coetzee was the first writer to be awarded the Booker Prize twice: for Life & Times of Michael K in 1983, and for Disgrace in 1999. As of 2020, three other authors have achieved this, Peter Carey, Hilary Mantel, and Margaret Atwood.

Summertime, named on the 2009 longlist, was an early favourite to win Coetzee an unprecedented third Booker Prize. It made the shortlist, but lost to bookmakers' favourite Wolf Hall, by Mantel. Coetzee was also longlisted in 2003 for Elizabeth Costello and in 2005 for Slow Man.

The Schooldays of Jesus, a follow-up to his 2013 novel The Childhood of Jesus, was longlisted for the 2016 Booker Prize.

=== 2003 Nobel Prize in Literature ===
On 2 October 2003, the Swedish Academy announced that Coetzee had been chosen as that year's recipient of the Nobel Prize in Literature, making him the fourth African writer to be so honoured and the second South African, after Nadine Gordimer. When awarding the prize, the Swedish Academy stated that Coetzee "in innumerable guises portrays the surprising involvement of the outsider". The press release for the award also cited his "well-crafted composition, pregnant dialogue and analytical brilliance", while focusing on the moral nature of his work. The prize ceremony was held in Stockholm on 10 December 2003.

=== Other awards and recognition ===
Coetzee is a three-time winner of South Africa's CNA Literary Award (in 1977, 1980 and 1983). His Waiting for the Barbarians received both the James Tait Black Memorial Prize and the Geoffrey Faber Memorial Prize, Age of Iron was awarded the Sunday Express Book of the Year award, and The Master of Petersburg was awarded The Irish Times International Fiction Prize in 1995. He has also won the French Prix Femina étranger and two Commonwealth Writers' Prizes for the African region, for Master of St Petersburg in 1995 and for Disgrace in 2000 (the latter personally presented by Queen Elizabeth II at Buckingham Palace), and the 1987 Jerusalem Prize for the Freedom of the Individual in Society. In 1998, he received the Lannan Literary Award for Fiction.

In 1984, Coetzee received an Honorary Fellow Award at the University of Cape Town. He was elected a Fellow of the Royal Society of Literature (FRSL) in 1988. In 2001 he won the Outstanding Alumnus award at the University of Texas. In 2004, he was made Honorary Fellow of the Australian Academy of the Humanities.

On 27 September 2005, the South African government awarded Coetzee the Order of Mapungubwe (gold class) for his "exceptional contribution in the field of literature and for putting South Africa on the world stage". In 2006, he was elected to the American Philosophical Society. He holds honorary doctorates from The American University of Paris (2010), the University of Adelaide (2005), La Trobe University, the University of Natal (1996), the University of Oxford, Rhodes University, the State University of New York at Buffalo, the University of Strathclyde, the University of Technology, Sydney, the Adam Mickiewicz University in Poznań, and the Universidad Iberoamericana.

In 2013, Richard Poplak of the Daily Maverick called Coetzee "inarguably the most celebrated and decorated living English-language author".

On 9 June 2025 Coetzee was appointed a Companion of the Order of Australia (AC).

==== Adelaide ====
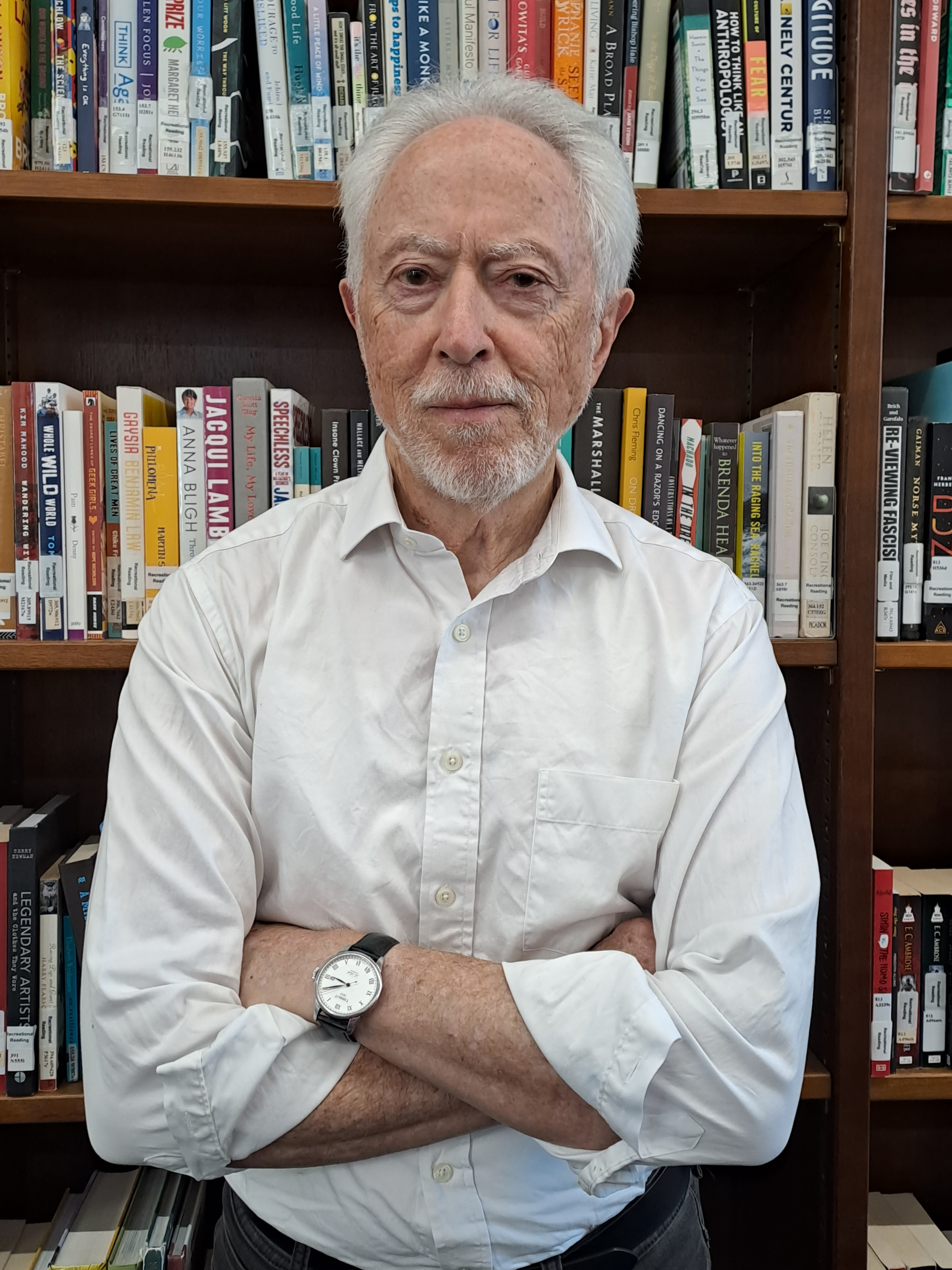
November 2023, Barr Smith Library, University of Adelaide

Coetzee first visited Adelaide in 1996, when he was invited to appear at Adelaide Writers' Week. He made subsequent appearances at the festival in 2004, 2010 (when he introduced Geoff Dyer), and 2019 (when he introduced Marlene van Niekerk).

In 2004, the Lord Mayor of Adelaide handed Coetzee the keys to the city.

In 2010, Coetzee was made an international ambassador for Adelaide Writers' Week, along with American novelist Susanna Moore and English poet Michael Hulse.

Coetzee is patron of the J. M. Coetzee Centre for Creative Practice (JMCCCP), a research centre and cultural hub founded at the University of Adelaide in 2015. The centre runs workshops with the aim of providing "a stimulating environment for emerging and established writers, scholars and musicians". Coetzee's work provides particular inspiration to encourage engagement with social and political issues, as well as music.

In November 2014, Coetzee was honoured with a three-day academic conference, "JM Coetzee in the World", in Adelaide. It was called "the culmination of an enormous collaborative effort and the first event of its kind in Australia" and "a reflection of the deep esteem in which John Coetzee is held by Australian academia".

From 9 to 10 November 2023, a celebration of Nobel Prize in Literature anniversaries, commemorating the winning of the prize by Coetzee in 2003 and Patrick White in 1973, was organised by the head of JMCCCP, Anne Pender, and held by the University of Adelaide. The program included several events over two days, including readings in the reading room of the Barr Smith Library by Coetzee, Christos Tsiolkas, Patrick Flanery, Helen Garner, Brian Castro, and others; music by Anna Goldsworthy and Paul Grabowsky; and screenings of Disgrace and The Eye of the Storm, which included talks by the filmmakers, at the Palace Nova Eastend Cinema.

== Views ==
=== South Africa ===
According to Fred Pfeil, Coetzee, André Brink and Breyten Breytenbach were at "the forefront of the anti-apartheid movement within Afrikaner literature and letters". On accepting the Jerusalem Prize in 1987, Coetzee spoke of the limitations of art in South African society, whose structures had resulted in "deformed and stunted relations between human beings" and "a deformed and stunted inner life". He added, "South African literature is a literature in bondage. It is a less than fully human literature. It is exactly the kind of literature you would expect people to write from prison", and called on the South African government to abandon its apartheid policy. The scholar Isidore Diala wrote that Coetzee, Nadine Gordimer, and Brink are "three of South Africa's most distinguished white writers, all with definite anti-apartheid commitment".

It has been argued that Coetzee's 1999 novel Disgrace allegorises South Africa's Truth and Reconciliation Commission (TRC). Asked about his views on the TRC, Coetzee said, "In a state with no official religion, the TRC was somewhat anomalous: a court of a certain kind based to a large degree on Christian teaching and on a strand of Christian teaching accepted in their hearts by only a tiny proportion of the citizenry. Only the future will tell what the TRC managed to achieve".

After his Australian citizenship ceremony, Coetzee said: "I did not so much leave South Africa, a country with which I retain strong emotional ties, but come to Australia. I came because from the time of my first visit in 1991, I was attracted by the free and generous spirit of the people, by the beauty of the land itself and—when I first saw Adelaide—by the grace of the city that I now have the honour of calling my home." When he moved to Australia, Coetzee cited the South African government's lax attitude to crime in that country as a reason, leading to a spat with Thabo Mbeki, who said, "South Africa is not only a place of rape", referencing Coetzee's Disgrace. In 1999, the African National Congress's submission to a South African Human Rights Commission investigation into racism in the media said that Disgrace depicted racist stereotypes. When Coetzee won the Nobel Prize, Mbeki congratulated him "on behalf of the South African nation and indeed the continent of Africa".

=== Politics ===
Coetzee has never specified any political orientation, though he has alluded to politics in his work, especially the role language plays in supporting the political and social structures of colonialism and nationalism. South African author Nadine Gordimer suggested that Coetzee had "a revulsion against all political and revolutionary solutions", and he has been praised for his condemnation of racism in his writing. Ella Fox-Martens criticised him for not explicitly denouncing apartheid, which he did when accepting the Jerusalem Prize.

Writing about his past in the third person, Coetzee wrote in Doubling the Point:

Politically, the raznochinets can go either way. But during his student years he, this person, this subject, my subject, steers clear of the right. As a child in Worcester he has seen enough of the Afrikaner right, enough of its rant, to last him a lifetime. In fact, even before Worcester, he has perhaps seen more of cruelty and violence than should have been allowed to a child. So as a student, he moves on the fringes of the left without being part of the left. Sympathetic to the human concerns of the left, he is alienated, when the crunch comes, by its language—by all political language, in fact.

Asked about the latter part of this passage in an interview, Coetzee said: "There is no longer a left worth speaking of, and a language of the left. The language of politics, with its new economistic bent, is even more repellent than it was 15 years ago".

In February 2016, Coetzee was one of 61 signatories to a letter to Australian prime minister Malcolm Turnbull and immigration minister Peter Dutton condemning their government's policy of offshore detention of asylum seekers.

In May 2016, Coetzee attended the Palestine Festival of Literature; on the closing night, he gave a brief speech, in which he said: "I was born and brought up in South Africa and so naturally people ask me what I see of South Africa in the present situation in Palestine. Using the word 'apartheid' to describe the way things are here I've never found to be a productive step. Like using the word 'genocide' to describe what happened in Turkey in the 1920s, using the word 'apartheid' diverts one into the inflamed semantic wrangle, which cuts short the opportunities of analysis." But, he added, "In Jerusalem and in the West Bank—to speak only of Jerusalem and the West Bank—we've seen a system of enforced segregation based on religion and ethnicity, put in place by an exclusive, self-defined group to consolidate the colonial conquest, in particular to maintain and, indeed, extend its hold on the land and its natural resources. Draw your own conclusions."

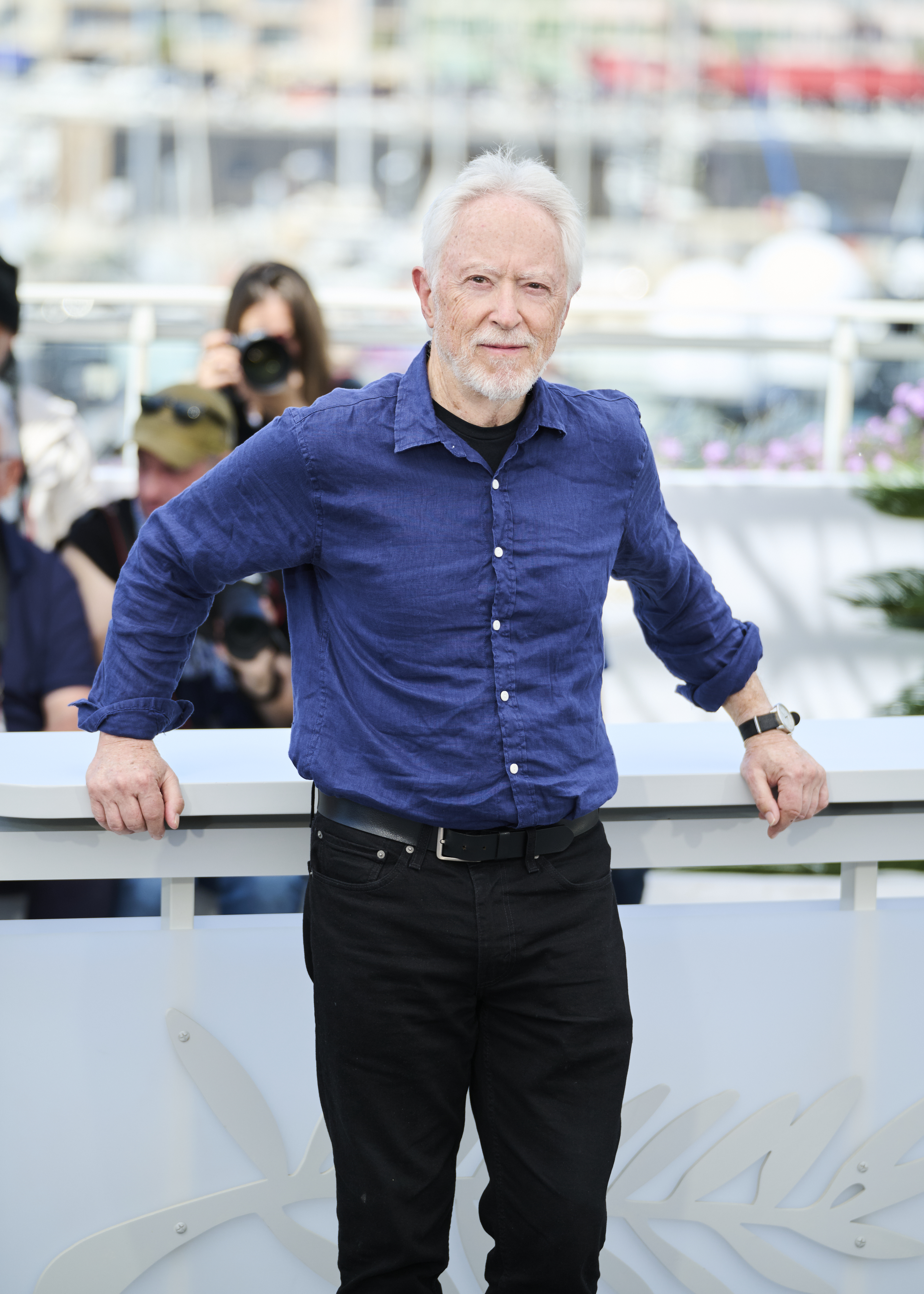
Coetzee at the 2026 Cannes Film Festival

In 2026, Coetzee declined an invitation from the Jerusalem Writers Festival due to Israel's actions in Gaza, which he called a "genocidal campaign". Coetzee wrote that due to widespread Israeli public support for the IDF's actions, "it is not possible for any considerable sector of Israeli society, including its intellectual and arts community, to claim that it should not share in the blame for the atrocities in Gaza."

=== Law ===
In 2005, Coetzee criticised contemporary anti-terrorism laws as resembling those of South Africa's apartheid regime: "I used to think that the people who created [South Africa's] laws that effectively suspended the rule of law were moral barbarians. Now I know they were just pioneers ahead of their time." The main character in Coetzee's 2007 book Diary of a Bad Year, which has been described as blending "memoir with fiction, academic criticism with novelistic narration" and refusing "to recognize the border that has traditionally separated political theory from fictional narrative", shares similar concerns about the policies of John Howard and George W. Bush.

=== Animals ===
In recent years, Coetzee has become a vocal critic of cruelty to animals and an advocate of animal rights. In a speech given on his behalf by Hugo Weaving in Sydney on 22 February 2007, Coetzee railed against the modern animal husbandry industry. The speech was for Voiceless, an Australian nonprofit animal protection organization of which Coetzee became a patron in 2004. Coetzee's fiction has similarly engaged with animal cruelty and animal welfare, especially The Lives of Animals, Disgrace, Elizabeth Costello, and The Old Woman and the Cats. He is a vegetarian.

In 2008, at the behest of John Banville, who alerted him to the matter, Coetzee wrote to The Irish Times of his opposition to Trinity College Dublin's use of vivisection on animals for scientific research. He wrote: "I support the sentiments expressed by John Banville. There is no good reason—in fact, there has never been any good reason, scientific or pedagogical—to require students to cut up living animals. Trinity College brings shame on itself by continuing with the practice." Nearly nine years later, when TCD's continued (and, indeed, increasing) practice of vivisection featured in the news, a listener to the RTÉ Radio 1 weekday afternoon show Liveline pointed out that Banville had previously raised the matter but been ignored. Banville then telephoned Liveline to call the practice "absolutely disgraceful" and recalled how his and Coetzee's efforts to intervene had been to no avail: "I was passing by the front gates of Trinity one day and there was a group of mostly young women protesting and I was interested. I went over and I spoke to them and they said that vivisection experiments were being carried out in the college. This was a great surprise to me and a great shock, so I wrote a letter of protest to The Irish Times. Some lady professor from Trinity wrote back essentially saying Mr. Banville should stick to his books and leave us scientists to our valuable work." Asked if he received any other support for his stance in the letter he sent to The Irish Times, Banville replied, "No. I became entirely dispirited and I thought, 'Just shut up, John. Stay out of it because I'm not going to do any good'. If I had done any good I would have kept it on. I mean, I got John Coetzee—you know, the famous novelist J. M. Coetzee—I got him to write a letter to The Irish Times. I asked a lot of people."

Coetzee wanted to be a candidate in the 2014 European Parliament election for the Dutch Party for the Animals, but the Dutch election board rejected his candidacy, arguing that candidates had to prove legal residence in the European Union.

=== Literatures of the South ===
In the early 1960s, while in London, Coetzee studied Spanish, and from 2015 to 2018, Coetzee was a director of a biannual seminar series on the Literatures of the South at the Universidad Nacional de San Martín in Argentina. This involved writers and literary figures from Southern Africa, Australia, New Zealand, and South America. The aim of the seminars, one observer remarked, was "to develop comparative perspectives on the literature" and journalism of the three areas, "to establish new intellectual networks, and to build a corpus of translated works from across the South through collaborative publishing ventures". He developed an interest in Argentine literature, and curated a series for the publishing house El Hilo de Ariadna, which includes Tolstoy's The Death of Ivan Ilyich, Samuel Beckett's Watt, and Patrick White's The Solid Mandala. His trilogy of novels The Childhood of Jesus, The Schooldays of Jesus, and The Death of Jesus reflect his preoccupation and evolution of ideas and views on language.

At the same time, he was involved in a research project in Australia, Other Worlds: Forms of World Literature, for which he led a theme on "Everyday Pleasures" that is also focused on the literatures of the South. Coetzee chose to publish The Schooldays of Jesus and The Death of Jesus in Australia, and The Pole in Argentina, before they were published in the U.K. or the U.S. In an interview with El Pais, he said, "the symbolism of publishing in the South before the North is important to me".

=== Copyright/piracy ===
When asked in 2015 to address unofficial Iranian translations of foreign works – Iran does not recognize international copyright agreements – Coetzee stated his disapproval of the practice on moral grounds and wished to have it sent to journalistic organisations in that country.

== Works ==
=== Novels ===
- Dusklands (1974), ISBN 0-14-024177-9
- In the Heart of the Country (1977), ISBN 0-14-006228-9
- Waiting for the Barbarians (1980), ISBN 0-14-006110-X
- Life & Times of Michael K (1983), ISBN 0-14-007448-1
- Foe (1986), ISBN 0-14-009623-X
- Age of Iron (1990), ISBN 978-0-394-58859-9
- The Master of Petersburg (1994), ISBN 0-14-023810-7
- Disgrace (1999), ISBN 978-0-14-311528-1
- Elizabeth Costello (2003), ISBN 0-670-03130-5
- Slow Man (2005), ISBN 0-670-03459-2
- Diary of a Bad Year (2007), ISBN 1-84655-120-X
- The Childhood of Jesus (2013), ISBN 978-1-84655-726-2
- The Schooldays of Jesus (2016), ISBN 978-1-91121-535-6
- The Death of Jesus (2019), ISBN 978-1-92226-828-0
- The Pole and Other Stories (2023), ISBN 9781787304055; note: published in the USA as The Pole (2023) ISBN 9781324093862

=== Autobiographical novels ===
- Boyhood: Scenes from Provincial Life (1997), ISBN 0-14-026566-X
- Youth: Scenes from Provincial Life II (2002), ISBN 0-670-03102-X
- Summertime (2009), ISBN 1-84655-318-0
- Scenes from Provincial Life (2011), ISBN 1-84655-485-3; an edited single volume of Boyhood: Scenes from Provincial Life, Youth: Scenes from Provincial Life II, and Summertime

=== Short fiction ===
- The Lives of Animals (Princeton, New Jersey: Princeton University Press, 1999) ISBN 0-691-07089-X
- Three Stories (Melbourne: Text Publishing, 2014) ISBN 9781922182562
- Moral Tales (unpublished manuscript). First published in Spanish translation as Siete cuentos morales (2018). Four of these stories were included in The Pole and Other Stories.

=== Articles and lectures ===
- Coetzee, J. M. (26 September 2019). "Australia's shame". The New York Review of Books., review of No Friend But the Mountains: Writing from Manus Prison by Behrouz Boochani (and other commentary relating to the Australian government's treatment of asylum seekers)
- The Lives of Animals, delivered for The Tanner Lectures on Human Values, Princeton, 1997
- "A Word from J. M. Coetzee", address read by Hugo Weaving at the opening of the exhibition "Voiceless: I Feel Therefore I Am" by Voiceless: The Animal Protection Institute, 22 February 2007, Sherman Galleries, Sydney, Australia

== Personal life ==
=== Non-literary activities ===
Coetzee was a key figure in the establishment of Oak Tree Press's First Chapter Series in 2006. The series produces limited-edition signed works by literary greats to raise money for the child victims and orphans of the African HIV/AIDS crisis.

=== Personal identity and public image ===
Coetzee has mentioned a number of literary figures who, like him, have tried "to transcend their national and historical contexts": Rainer Maria Rilke, Jorge Luis Borges, Samuel Beckett, James Joyce, T. S. Eliot, Ezra Pound, and Zbigniew Herbert—outsiders to Western culture who moved countries and/or wrote in different languages. He has said, "as a child, as a young man, as a student, I had absolutely no doubt that access to the English language was liberating me from the narrow world view of the Afrikaner", and "I have a good command of English, spoken and written, but more and more it feels to me like the kind of command that a foreigner might have". He has written about his feeling of being an "outsider", such as his experience of being a colonial when living in London, which he writes about in Youth, and characters in his novels have sometimes been outsiders.

On 6 March 2006, Coetzee became an Australian citizen, and it has been argued that his "acquired 'Australianness' is deliberately adopted and stressed" by Australians.

Coetzee is generally reluctant to speak about himself and his work, but has written about himself in several autobiographical novels (Boyhood, Youth, and Summertime). He has been described as reclusive, avoiding publicity to such an extent that he did not collect either of his two Booker Prizes in person. The South African writer Rian Malan, in oft-quoted words from an article published in the New Statesman in 1999, called Coetzee "a man of almost monkish self-discipline and dedication", and reported—based on hearsay—that he rarely laughed or even spoke. Asked about these comments in an email interview, Coetzee replied: "I have met Rian Malan only once in my life. He does not know me and is not qualified to talk about my character."

=== Family ===
Coetzee married Philippa Jubber in Johannesburg on 11 July 1963. They divorced in 1980. They had a son, Nicolas, and a daughter, Gisela. Nicolas died in 1989 at the age of 23 after accidentally falling from the balcony of his Johannesburg apartment.

Coetzee's younger brother, the journalist David Coetzee, died in 2010.

Dorothy Driver, an academic at the University of Adelaide, has been Coetzee's partner since 1980.

== See also ==
- List of African writers
- List of animal rights advocates
- List of vegetarians
- List of South African Nobel laureates and nominees
