= Life & Times of Michael K =

1983 novel by J.M. Coetzee

- First South African edition cover
- Author: J. M. Coetzee
- Cover artist: Marcus Wilson-Smith
- Language: English
- Genre: Novel
- Publisher: Ravan Press (Johannesburg)
- Publication date: 1983
- Publication place: South Africa
- Media type: Print (Hardback & Paperback)
- ISBN: 0-86975-159-X
- OCLC: 13574499

Life & Times of Michael K is a 1983 novel by South African-Australian writer J. M. Coetzee. The novel won the Booker Prize for 1983. The novel is a story of a man named Michael K, who makes an arduous journey from Cape Town to his mother's rural birthplace, amid a fictitious civil war during the apartheid era, in the 1970s-80s.

== Plot summary ==
The novel is split into three parts.

The novel begins with Michael K, a poor man with a cleft lip who has spent his childhood in institutions and works as a gardener in Cape Town. Michael tends to his mother who works as a domestic servant to a wealthy family. The country descends into civil war and martial law is imposed, and Michael's mother becomes very sick. Michael decides to quit his job and escape the city to return his mother to her birthplace, which she says was Prince Albert.

Michael finds himself unable to obtain the proper permits for travel out of the city so he builds a shoddy rickshaw to carry his mother, and they go on their way. Soon after escaping, Michael's mother dies in a hospital. He lingers for some time, carrying his mother's ashes around with him in a box. Finally, Michael decides to continue on his journey to Prince Albert to deliver his mother's ashes. Along the way, though, he is detained for not having the required travel papers, thus being assigned to work detail on a railway track.

After his job on the railway track is finished, Michael makes his way to the farm his mother spoke of in Prince Albert. The farm is abandoned and desolate. Soon, Michael discovers how to live off the land. However, when one of the relatives of the legal owners of the farm arrives, he treats Michael like a servant. Michael dislikes this treatment so he escapes up into the mountains.

In the mountains, Michael goes through a period of starvation while he becomes aware of his surroundings. In his malnourished state he finds his way down to a town where he is picked up by the police and is sent to a work camp. Here, Michael meets a man named Robert. Robert explains that the workers in the camp are exploited for cheap labor by the townspeople. Eventually, there is an attack on Prince Albert and the workers of the camp are blamed. The local police captain takes over and Michael escapes.

Michael finds his way back to the farm but soon feels claustrophobic within the house. Therefore, he builds a shelter in the open where he is able to watch his garden. Rebels come out of the mountains and use his garden. Although Michael is angered by this he stays in hiding. Michael becomes malnourished and delirious again because he has not come out of hiding. He is found by some soldiers and is taken to a rehabilitation camp in Cape Town. It is here that Michael is identified as "CM," an abbreviation most likely signifying "colored male."

At the rehabilitation camp, a doctor becomes interested in Michael. He finds Michael's simple nature fascinating and considers him to be unfairly accused of aiding the rebels. Michael becomes very sick and delirious because he refuses to eat. The doctor tries to understand Michael's stubborn ways while attempting to get Michael released. However, Michael escapes on his own.

Upon his escape, Michael meets with a group of nomadic people who feed him and introduce him to a woman who has sex with him. He returns to the apartment where he and his mother lived in Cape Town, the same apartment and city he had tried to escape some time ago. Michael reflects on the garden he made in Prince Albert.

Some commentators notice a connection between the character Michael K and the protagonist Josef K. in The Trial by Franz Kafka. The book also bears many references to Kafka, and it is believed, "K" is a tribute to Kafka. Comparisons have also been drawn between the novel and Heinrich von Kleist's novella Michael Kohlhaas, based upon the protagonist's name and similarities of plot, though it is often suggested that Coetzee's work is an antithetical response.

== Major characters ==
=== Michael K (K) ===
A simple man born in South Africa, K bears the deformity of a cleft lip. K's central role is underscored by his appearance—he is deformed and because of this, people look down upon him. His mother, the police, and Visagie's grandson all treat him with respect of a lesser human on the basis that he looks and acts slow. This is shown by the fact that K's mother institutionalizes him until she needs him, the police let him wander around unnoticed because he has a childish innocence, and Visagie's grandson treats him as a common servant.

But K is also dedicated to being true to his beliefs. When K's mother becomes very ill, he dedicates his life to taking her home at whatever the cost. And when she dies along the way, K continues to show his dedication by carrying her ashes all the way to Prince Albert so she can finally be home.

When K is institutionalized he becomes a gardener, where he learns to enjoy isolation and the freedom it grants him. We see K's isolation and freedom continue throughout the book, starting at the Visagie's house where he first begins to learn to live off the land. But when his freedom is encroached on, K flees even further from society, maintaining his freewill. In the mountains he understands how he wants to live his life, which involves only eating food he has grown from the Earth. K ultimately returns to Cape Town and to his mother's old apartment, never giving up his longing for freedom.

=== Anna K ===
Michael K's mother disliked him since she saw his disfigurement. Anna put K into a government institution and ignored him until she had no one else to turn to because of her health. Though she seems to have been uncaring and absent during his childhood, K shows his unconditional love for her by taking care of her until her death. Anna lived her life in fear: fear of losing her job, getting sick, or being put out on the street.

=== The medical officer ===
The infirmary medical officer at the rehabilitation camp is responsible for taking care of K when he is brought in. The medical officer was the only one of the staff at the hospital to realize K is an innocent civilian, being unfairly treated for being in the wrong place at the wrong time. The medical officer becomes fascinated by K and his childish nature and his reasons for not eating.

The medical officer originally thinks K wants to kill himself—hence his reason for not eating—but he comes to understand that K does want to live, just on his own terms. After K's escape, the medical officer realizes that because the camp is becoming under more strict military control, he is envious of K's freedom. K changes the medical officer's outlook on life: the medical officer fantasizes about following K and begging K to let him live like him.

== Themes ==
=== The value of human life ===
Michael K is often seen as a parasite, or unskilled worker throughout this book. He doesn't have a very high social status and he is aware of that. At times he purposely acts dumb, like not speaking, because he knows he can get away with it. However, Michael knows that he still has a purpose in this world but it takes him the whole book to discover what that purpose is. He spends his time living off the land one day at a time. He doesn't realize until later that he was born to be a gardener. The goal of his journey is not to find his purpose but to assist his mother and fulfill her wishes, what he believed to be his original purpose in life. Michael happens to stumble upon his gardening skills by doing what he had to for survival. He loves his life as a gardener and realizes that most other people wouldn't be able to survive as he did. There are times where he questions his love for gardening when others tell him that he should be a fencer, just as everyone questions if they're making the right choice. He believes that, "A man must live so that he leaves no trace of his living." Becoming a gardener is Michael's best bet for living out his philosophy.

=== Mother/son enmeshment ===
Michael is closely emotionally attached to his mother, such that he is unable to express an emotional response to the world outside of this relationship. He is held within the matrix of this relationship, and having never learned to engage with the world outside, expresses great distress whenever challenged to do so. The medical officer sums up this relationship, writing to Michael, "[...] you should have got away at an early age from that mother of yours, who sounds like a real killer. [...] [Whilst] performing all the other feats of filial piety you no doubt performed, I also think of her sitting on your shoulders, eating out your brains, glaring about triumphantly, the very embodiment of great Mother Death." Michael exhibits some growth at the end of the story, through contact with kind peers.

=== Time ===
In the conclusion, Michael ponders whether the moral of his story is "that there is enough time for everything." The concept of time is present throughout the whole novel. The book ends with a metaphor: "[H]e would lower [the spoon] down the shaft deep into the earth, and when he brought it up there would be water in the bowl of the spoon; and in that way, he would say, one can live."

=== War and military authority ===
The novel takes place in South Africa during a civil war in the 1970-80s, and K often crosses paths with soldiers throughout the story. These tend, based on flimsy or non-existent evidence, to accuse K and other people of various crimes such as theft or sabotage, while themselves performing corresponding acts of aggression with impunity. K is also more than once drafted into forced labour and placed in camps that vaguely resemble concentration camps. The inmates are given food, but eventually K rejects it. This appears to be a passive resistance to internment and arbitrary authority, though K may be only vaguely aware of his motives. He grows weaker and weaker until he finally escapes. Later on he is taken to a hospital instead, because he is too weak to work. He is better treated here, but nevertheless again refuses to eat and escapes. He does not evince much interest in the war, except as the soldiers pose a threat to him, from which he must hide or risk repeated internment or violence.

=== Race ===
The story, which takes place during the apartheid regime and related racial conflicts, makes a reference to race, specifically, that there is a war "so that minorities can have a say in their own destinies." This line, spoken by a character in the hospital Michael stays in, implies Michael interacts with soldiers in the white side of a war between races in South Africa. It is also implied at various points that this side is losing the war.

The only other instance race is specified is in Part 1 of the novel, "Michael Visagie--CM--40--NFA--Unemployed". "CM" stands for "colored male", telling the reader that Michael "Visagie" (which isn't Michael's surname) is an unemployed, 40-year-old, colored male with no fixed address. However, we are not told what race other characters belong to, nor are there any references to race politics or confrontations or any racial slurs in the dialogue.

== Adaptations ==
In March 2022 at the Baxter Theatre Centre in Cape Town, Life & Times of Michael K made its South African debut where it was adapted for the stage by Lara Foot in collaboration with the Handspring Puppet Company.

This same production opened on December 4, 2023 at St. Ann's Warehouse in Brooklyn, New York. The productions received positive accolades, including the 2023 Fleur du Cap Theatre Award for Best Production.
