= The Mercy Seat (song) =

1988 single by Nick Cave and the Bad Seeds

Single by Nick Cave and the Bad Seeds

from the album Tender Prey
- Released: June 1988 (UK)
- Genre: Alternative rock
- Length: 7:17 (album version); 5:04 (single version)
- Label: Mute
- Songwriters: Nick Cave; Mick Harvey

Nick Cave and the Bad Seeds singles chronology
"The Singer" (1986)	"The Mercy Seat" (1988)	"Deanna" (1988)

"The Mercy Seat" is a song written by Nick Cave (lyrics and music) and Mick Harvey (music), originally performed by Nick Cave and the Bad Seeds. It was released as a single in 1988, with a longer version also appearing that year as the opening track on the Bad Seeds' album Tender Prey. The song's narrator is a prisoner awaiting execution in the electric chair, while its title refers to the biblical "mercy seat", associated with God's presence and judgment.

The song received widespread critical acclaim upon its release, with NME and other alternative music magazines voting it single of the year. It has subsequently been ranked as one of the greatest songs of all time by Pitchfork and Rolling Stone editor Toby Creswell, who included it in his list of the 1001 greatest songs.

The song has been covered by others, most notably Johnny Cash.

== Background and writing ==
"The Mercy Seat" emerged while Cave was working with director John Hillcoat on the Australian prison film Ghosts... of the Civil Dead (1988), which Cave appeared in, co-wrote and scored. In preparation for the film, Cave read extensively on prisons and criminal violence, a process which informed much of his musical output at the time, including "The Mercy Seat". Blixa Bargeld recalled Cave reading many works on serial killers, and also the letters of outlaw Ned Kelly, including his "last testimonial", the Jerilderie Letter. Writer Adam Steiner notes that the "The Mercy Seat" bears traces of the Jerilderie Letter's "rebel vernacular ... imbued with a fiery righteousness and forbidding command".

The song was also written during a period of severe personal struggle and heroin addiction for Cave, and mirrors themes of confinement and judgment found in his concurrent novel, And the Ass Saw the Angel (1989). Cave later recalled that the song began as a distraction from the novel, with him scribbling lyrics on scraps of paper whenever he reached a stopping point in his writing, eventually piecing them together into "The Mercy Seat".

Regarding the song's composition, Mick Harvey recalled it being assembled from several different ideas, an approach he considered unusual for the Bad Seeds, with most of their songs having a single starting point. Its relentless rhythm began with Cave asking the band to imitate the fast drum-machine sound of Suicide; Harvey then created the bass figure by striking two strings with drumsticks, while Cave developed the song's seven-chord cycle around it.

== Recording ==
The recording of the song was itself unusually arduous, with recording sessions taking place over six months and across six studios in West Berlin, London and Melbourne. Rather than recording the band performing the song live, the track was constructed around a tape loop and eventually expanded to 48 tracks and two synchronised tape machines. Recorder-producer Tony Cohen recalled that "The Mercy Seat" was "an incredibly hard recording to control", describing the accumulation of overdubs as producing "noise" and "chaos". He later reflected that the song "took a few years off my life", describing the recording process as immersive and "crazed", compounded by days without sleep and hallucinations as he and some members of the Bad Seeds neared the end of a "nasty binge".

== Themes ==
The song is told from the first-person perspective of a condemned man awaiting execution by electric chair. He initially insists on his innocence and questions the basis of his conviction, while the verses unfold as a fragmented stream of consciousness, combining observations of prison life with Christian and biblical imagery and reflections on guilt, truth, punishment and death.

The song juxtaposes retributive justice with Christian ideas of mercy and redemption. Its title refers both to the electric chair and to the biblical mercy seat, or kaporet, which, in the Old Testament, is the symbol of the throne of God over the Ark of the Covenant.

The song contains the following chorus:

And the mercy seat is waiting
And I think my head is burning
And in a way I'm yearning
To be done with all this measuring of proof.
An eye for an eye
And a tooth for a tooth
And anyway I told the truth
And I'm not afraid to die.

This section is repeated fifteen times during the course of the song, with a number of variations in the text. Specific allusions to scripture include those to Leviticus 16:11–19 and Leviticus 24:19–21.

As the song progresses, the narrator's claims of innocence become increasingly contradictory and unstable, culminating in the admission: "I'm afraid I told a lie". The line has been interpreted as a possible confession of guilt, an admission of self-deception, or a moment of spiritual recognition; its ambiguity also leaves open the possibility that the narrator is admitting to having lied about not fearing death.

Like many of Cave's songs, "The Mercy Seat" suggests autobiography. Critics have noted the confluence of themes from the Old and the New Testament, especially in its juxtaposing the "eye for an eye" justice of the Old Testament with the merciful appearance of the "ragged stranger," Christ. This problem of the relationship between the law and forgiveness remains unresolved.

Cave later said, "Before I was able to write things like, 'I'm not afraid to die'. And kids come up to me and say, 'Hey, that line means so much to me'. And I have to sort of say I don't feel that way any more. I don't feel as cocky about death as I used to. I wake up in mad panics about death approaching."

== Versions ==
On the original album version, Cave's vocals are delivered over a thick backing of guitars, organ, and strings. An acoustic version was also released as part of a bonus CD/7" for the album The Good Son entitled Acoustic Versions from Tender Prey. This version was later reissued to appear on both the Stripped EP and B-Sides & Rarities. The song is a live standard of Cave's, and has been performed at almost every concert since 1988; an acoustic live version, performed in the United States in 1989, appears in the documentary The Road to God Knows Where. A much louder version appears as the opening track of the 1993 album Live Seeds.

An acoustic version recorded in May 1998 for Keith Cameron's Xfm show, The Carve Up, was released on a compilation CD of the same name in 1999.

The song also features on the 2013 live album Live from KCRW.

== Reception and legacy ==
"The Mercy Seat" received widespread critical acclaim on its release and has subsequently been regarded as one of Cave's signature songs. It was named the single of the year by NME, Sounds and Melody Maker, and also reached number 10 in John Peel's 1988 Festive Fifty.

Retrospectively, NME ranked it number 23 on its list of the 100 best songs of the 1980s and number 397 on its 500 greatest songs of all time list. Pitchfork ranked it number 110 on its list of the 200 best songs of the 1980s. It was also included in The Pitchfork 500 and Toby Creswell's 1001 Songs You Must Hear Before You Die.

In 2023, Mojo ranked the song number one on their list of the 30 greatest Nick Cave songs.

The song inspired the title and one of the epigraphs of Neil LaBute's 2002 play The Mercy Seat.

== Cover versions ==
Country singer Johnny Cash covered the song on his 2000 album American III: Solitary Man, as one of a number of songs Cash sang about the "convicted innocent." Cash stated he heard the song after seeing the news about executions in Texas, and that more attention should be paid to capital punishment: "If a man's been there 25 years, maybe we should consider whether or not he has become a good human being and do we still want to kill him." Cash's version features guitar, organ, and piano accompaniment.

Cave commented on Cash's cover in a number of interviews: "Like all the songs he does, he made it his own. He's a great interpreter of songs – that's part of his genius. These are the things that can't be taken away from you." He called it a personal highpoint: "'It doesn't matter what anyone says,' remarked Cave proudly. 'Johnny Cash recorded my song.'"

== Track listing ==
The track listing for the single is:

- CD
1. "The Mercy Seat" (single version)
2. "New Day" [actually "New Morning" mistitled]
3. "From Her to Eternity" (film version)
4. "Tupelo" (single version)
- 7"
1. "The Mercy Seat" (single version)
2. "New Day"
- 12"
1. "The Mercy Seat" (full-length album version)
2. "New Day" [actually "New Morning" mistitled]
3. "The Mercy Seat" (video mix)

== Charts ==
Chart (1988)	Peak position
UK Indie Chart	3
UK Singles (Official Charts)	86

== See also ==
- Nick Cave and The Bad Seeds discography
