= King Ink II =

Book by Nick Cave

- First edition cover, 1997
- Author: Nick Cave
- Language: English
- Genre: Poetry, lyrics
- Publisher: Black Spring Press
- Publication date: July 1997
- Publication place: United Kingdom
- Media type: Print (hardback)
- Pages: 193
- ISBN: 1-880985-49-7
- Preceded by: King Ink

King Ink II is a collection of poetry, lyrics and writings by Australian musician and author Nick Cave. It was first published in the United Kingdom by Black Spring Press in 1997 and is a follow-up to Cave's first collection of writings, King Ink (1988).

Cave's writings included in King Ink II extends from the period from the Nick Cave and the Bad Seeds' fifth studio album, Tender Prey (1988) to tenth studio album The Boatman's Call (1997). The book also includes lyrics written for other artists and for film soundtracks, including Wim Wenders' Faraway, So Close! and Until the end of the World.

== Other editions ==
Translated versions of King Ink II have also been published. Italian translations, under the title Re Inkiostro II were published by Arcana Editrice in 1997, Czech translations were published by Mata 1988, along with Japanese and Croatian translations (under the title Zagrebacka naklada). Polish translations were published in 1999. In 1993, it was published in the United States by 2.13.61.

== Reception ==
The A.V. Club reviewer John Krewson said although "Cave is one of the more interesting songwriters making music today" that King Ink II was "for-fans-only."
