= Deanna (song) =

Single by Nick Cave and the Bad Seeds

from the album Tender Prey
- B-side: "The Girl at the Bottom of My Glass"
- Released: 5 September 1988
- Genre: Garage rock
- Length: 3:45
- Label: Mute
- Songwriters: Nick Cave, Mick Harvey

Nick Cave and the Bad Seeds singles chronology
"The Mercy Seat" (1988)	"Deanna" (1988)	"The Ship Song" (1990)

"Deanna" is a song by Nick Cave and the Bad Seeds. It is the second single from their 1988 album Tender Prey. An acoustic version of the song opens the 2005 compilation B-sides & Rarities and includes phrases from the Edwin Hawkins Singers' song Oh Happy Day on which the song was based.

== Inspiration ==
Biographer Ian Johnston claimed that Deanna was a woman Nick Cave had recently had a "passionate, intense relationship with". Cave later said the song is "seen as a particularly brutal act of betrayal, and thirty years on I still haven’t been fully forgiven. I console myself with the thought that I was unflinching in my duties as a songwriter, even though it broke a heart (or two) in the process."

== Recording ==
Initial recording was done at Vielklang Studios, near the Berlin Wall. Producer Tony Cohen said, ""Deanna" was a loose idea Nick had for a song. He fiddled around with a Hammond organ while Mick hit a floor tom. It wasn't meant for the record. Drums were recorded over the top and the track grew."

== "The Girl at the Bottom of My Glass" ==
The B-side of "Deanna" is "The Girl at the Bottom of My Glass", recorded for but not released on Tender Prey. It remained unreleased on an album until 2005, with the release of B-Sides & Rarities.

== Reception ==
AllMusic called the song, "a garage rock-style rave-up that lyrically is everything Natural Born Killers tried to be, but failed at -- killing sprees, Cadillacs, and carrying out the work of the Lord, however atypically". Stereogum noted, "the irresistible, danceable sway of the organ and drumbeat distract - if only momentarily - from such lines as 'I cum a death’s head into your frock'".

The Quietus wrote, "The rousing garage pop of "Deanna" would quickly become one of Cave's best-known songs (it was almost 'radio friendly') and a live favourite. The track was based on a version of Edwin Hawkins' "Oh Happy Day". The lyrics were particularly memorable."

== Charts ==
Chart (1988)	Peak position
UK Indie Chart	4
