= Faith, Hope, and Carnage =

2022 book

- Cover to the first American hardback edition
- Author: Nick Cave; Sean O'Hagan
- Audio read by: Nick Cave
- Cover artist: Alex Merto
- Language: Australian English
- Subject: Biography; memoir
- Set in: 20th and 21st centuries
- Publisher: Canongate Books (UK), Farrar, Straus and Giroux (USA)
- Publication date: 20 September 2022
- Publication place: United Kingdom; United States of America
- Media type: Hardback; audiobook
- Pages: 294
- ISBN: 9780374607371
- LC Class: 2022022690
- Website: Official website

Faith, Hope, and Carnage is a 2022 book by Australian rock musician Nick Cave in conversation with Irish journalist and critic Seán O’Hagan beginning in 2020. The book explores Cave's personal life and journey as a musician, including the 2015 death of his son Arthur, Cave's battle with heroin addiction, and lifelong struggle with Christianity. The work has received positive reviews from critics and is included in many best-of lists.

== Composition and promotion ==
The book is made up of edited conversations between Cave and O'Hagan spanning more than 40 hours across the two years and was announced in September 2021. The turn toward spirituality was an ongoing part of Cave's life, with his fascination with the person of Jesus Christ in particular and the profound sense of human fragility that he gained due to losing his son as well as the COVID-19 pandemic. The longform discussion style was influenced by The Paris Review and contemporary podcasting and makes the first interview that Cave had done in years.

The authors have scheduled promotional tour appearances to discuss the book, with eight dates in Europe in May and June 2023.

== Reception ==
For Kirkus Reviews, the publication assessed the book as "a somber, sage book about art-making that deserves a readership beyond Cave’s fan base", noting that "this is a lively, engrossing book energized by Cave’s relentless candor—and sometimes counterintuitive thinking—about his work and his demons". Writing for USA Today, Barbara VanDenburgh noted that this was one of the "hottest new releases" of the week. Pitchfork Media shortlisted this among the 15 best music books of 2022, with critic Jenn Pelly calling it "astoundingly intimate". Rolling Stone's review of the best music books of 2022 includes Faith, Hope, and Carnage, with Lisa Tozzi calling it "incredibly moving, hopeful, and at times very funny".

The Conversation's Lyn McCredden notes the honesty that Cave has for approaching the darker times in his life and how the musician has turned toward forgiveness, a sense of mystery, and attempts at radical listening as he has aged. Writing for the Australian Broadcasting Company, Adrian Rosenfeldt notes Cave's attempts to work through his grief with this book as well as his blog Red Hand Files that allowed him to interact with fans directly: both works allow the singer to "challeng[e] the overarching values that underlie the modern West: secularism, rationalism, and individualism... and to argue that religion and music help us to recognise a deeper, more creative way of being".

In The Guardian, Alexis Petridis notes that Cave has "fascinating things to say" a variety of topics, but "the book’s most striking sections are those that deal with grief", characterizing the text as "occasionally deeply harrowing reading"; the newspaper also listed it as one of the 25 best Australian books of 2022. Writing for The Observer (where O’Hagan has been published for decades), Rachel Clarke portrays the work as "astonishing, heart-rending conversations" that have "wit, passion and restless intelligence" for topics as diverse as "love, death, heroin addiction, pottery, childhood, religion and the inscrutable alchemy of songwriting. But in the end, every word orbits Arthur, the boy whose absence became a galvanising life force for his father", summing up her review that the book is "an exquisite articulation of the human condition". In The Daily Telegraph, Suzanne Moore rated this work five out of five stars, noting the dichotomies of Cave's character and the contradictions apparent in the long conversations, particularly his interest in and skepticism of Christian faith; the publication ranked Faith, Hope, and Carnage 46th on their listing of the 50 best books of 2022. In ArtReview, James Cook opined that this work "transcends the genre of the rockstar memoir" due to Cave's ability to discuss a variety of intimate subjects with "eloquence and humility". Adam Steiner of Louder Than War tells readers that the book "is less benign, and more confrontational than it might seem" and sums up his review by stating that the authors "offers shining light by which we might know ourselves better and reaffirms the power of music where can find awakening, resistance and a renewed passion for hope". Ludovic Hunter-Tilney of Financial Times gave a negative review, criticizing the question-and-answer format as well as the thematic insights, calling Cave's perspective on mourning "the results represent a thinner reiteration of his impressive project to reimagine grief as “a gift”, a “defiant, sometimes mutinous energy” that can be put to service in trying to make the world a better place". The Sunday Times included it in their roundup of the 37 best books of 2022, calling it "a beautiful, profoundly generous book, few pages passing without a line that stops you in your tracks". The New Statesman also listed it as one of the best of 2022, with Rowan Williams calling it "the most compelling book of the year". The Big Issue called this the book of the year for bringing "new depth to the art of the interview" that constitutes "an epiphany".

Éamon Sweeney of The Irish Times calls the book "brave and brilliant" work with "illuminating reflections on loss and ‘the terrible beauty of grief’" that was made possible due to the decades-long association the musician and journalist have with one another. A review of the books of the year by several critics in the newspaper found Sinéad Gleeson writing that this book "stopped [her] in [her] tracks". Barry Egan of Irish Independent recalls Cave's history of drug use and religious skepticism and how they are expressed in the book as well as the deaths of Cave's son and mother that make for "a book that fuses his humour, intellect, wit and passion into one long philosophical meditation on living and dying".

Several reviewers from Christian spiritual press have praised the work as well. In Anglican publication Church Times, priest John Davies connects this work to Cave's other spiritual exploration and attempts to identify with others through grief. The publication also interviewed Cave on the topics explored in the book and Rowan Williams commented that it was a pick for a Christmas gift, calling it "a quite extraordinary testament, intensely moving". The Christian Century, a mainline Protestant and progressive Christian magazine characterizes Cave as a "missionary of grief", noting his trenchant analysis of "grief, suffering, and trauma, both personal and collective, in our experience of the COVID-19 pandemic". Elizabeth Oldfield of the Bruderhof magazine Plough called this editor's pick an "electric" combination of Cave's attraction to the church and O'Hagan's distrust of it, noting that "those without an interest in religion will still find much in the book, but what I found so radically refreshing is the unabashed longing for God". Catholic publisher Word on Fire featured a review by institute fellow Andrew Petiprin, noting Cave's unique style on display in the book that is "avant-garde, manly, and most of all, deeply religious... [and] sometimes heart-wrenching" and calls this work a "valuable resource for anyone interested in the intersection of modern art and Christianity", noting the history of spiritual themes in Cave's music.

== See also ==
- Theological virtues, defined as faith, hope and charity (i.e. love)
