= And the Ass Saw the Angel =

Book by Nick Cave

- Author: Nick Cave
- Language: English
- Genre: Gothic novel, Southern Gothic
- Publisher: Black Spring Press, HarperCollins
- Publication date: 1989
- Publication place: United Kingdom
- Media type: Print (hardback and paperback)
- Pages: 320 pp
- ISBN: 1-880985-72-1
- OCLC: 51528255
- Preceded by: King Ink
- Followed by: The Death of Bunny Munro

And the Ass Saw the Angel is the first novel by the Australian musician and singer Nick Cave, originally published in 1989 by Black Spring Press in the United Kingdom and HarperCollins in the United States. It was re-published in 2003 by 2.13.61. A luxury "collector's edition" was released, in the summer of 2007, by Black Spring Press.

The title is a biblical quotation from the Book of Numbers, Chapter 22, Verses 23-31: "And the ass saw the angel of the Lord standing in the way, ...". With its Southern Gothic setting, critics have compared it favorably with novels by American authors William Faulkner and Flannery O'Connor.

Cave's second novel, The Death of Bunny Munro, was published in September 2009.

In 2009, "Nick Cave: The Exhibition" toured nationally in Australia. The exhibition - which displayed original lyrics, notebooks, artwork, photography and books, as well as objects from Cave's own library and office - included Cave's original manuscript of And the Ass Saw the Angel.

== Origin ==
The origin of And the Ass Saw the Angel was an unfilmed screenplay by Cave and Evan English titled Swampland (a song bearing that title appeared on the Mutiny! EP released by Cave's band, The Birthday Party, in 1983). When the film project fell through, Cave expanded the script into a novel. Cave's essay The Flesh Made Word - written for a radio broadcast by BBC Radio 3 in 1996 and reprinted in King Ink II in 1997 - includes Cave's recollection of writing And the Ass Saw the Angel:

In 1985, I went to live in Berlin, where I got it into my head to write a novel, and for the next three years I locked away myself in a room in Kreuzberg and wrote it. I called it And the Ass Saw the Angel. It was about a mad, hermetic mute boy called Euchrid Eucrow, who, having been denied the faculty of speech, eventually explodes in a catharsis of rage and brings to its knees the religious community in which he lives. The story, set in the American South and told through the voice (or non-voice) of Euchrid Eucrow, was written in a kind of hyper-poetic thought-speak not meant to be spoken, a mongrel language that was part Biblical, part Deep South dialect, part gutter slang, at times obscenely reverent and at others reverently obscene. Throughout the story, God fills the mute boy with information, loads him up with bad ideas, "hate inspiration straight from God," as he puts it. But with no one to talk to, and now (sic) way to talk, Euchrid, like a blocked pipe, bursts. For me, Euchrid is Jesus struck dumb, he is the blocked artist, he is internalized imagination become madness.

== Plot ==
And the Ass Saw the Angel tells the story of Euchrid Eucrow, a mute born to an abusive drunken mother and a father obsessed with animal torture and the building of dangerous traps. The family live in a valley of fanatically religious Ukulites, where they are shunned. Euchrid's mental breakdown includes horrific angelic visions, and the story builds towards Euchrid exacting terrible vengeance on the people who have made him suffer.

== Major themes ==
The lyrics of some of the songs from the first few albums of Nick Cave and the Bad Seeds (From Her to Eternity, The Firstborn Is Dead and Your Funeral... My Trial), are extensions of the ideas represented in the novel. The title comes from the Bible, the Book of Numbers 22:23, where Balaam does not see the angel of the Lord but his donkey does. The Bible is heavily referenced throughout the novel. In an interview with BOMB magazine, Cave noted, "There are a number of voices in the book: first person narrative by Euchrid, third person authorial voice, quotations usually from the Bible, either real or ersatz, constant changes in tone or approach to language, depending on who is talking. When I first started the book there were certain elements I wasn’t interested in reading about. When you read a novel, you have to wade through the setting up of the scene before the story starts. So I wrote a long prologue. It has no action. It includes documentary, poetry, maps and charts, in very short chapters. Once this is done, the actual story begins. The voice then changes between the narrator’s truth and Euchrid’s delusionary truth. The final book is Euchrid’s monologue which runs to the climax" The book is narrated in the protagonist's silent Southern drawl, which Cave writes in eye dialect.

One particularly present theme is Man's inhumanity to man and their innate ability to fear what they do not understand. Euchrid is constantly under siege from those who perceive difference as a threat. The only other character to see Euchrid as something more than a dumb beast is Beth (and to a certain extent, her mother). Though Beth is taken into the fold by the Ukulites, she too is different from the rest. There is a transference of thought throughout the novel; her difference is seen by the community as godly, while Beth sees Euchrid as godly. Another theme presented in the novel is the beauty of things perceived as ugly. In an interview with director Lindzee Smith, Cave said, "The things that are ugly are supposed to be ugly. I’d hate to think the book was only about ugly things. It’s about innocence as well ––the beauty in that. There’s a cartoon image to many of the characters––Beth, who I see as the idealized young girl, perfect and innocent, seen through the obsessive eyes of Euchrid."

== Publication history ==
- 1989, UK, Black Spring Press, ISBN 0-948238-03-8, 24 August 1989, hardcover, 272 pp
- 1989, US, HarperCollins, ISBN 0-06-016491-3, September 1990, hardcover
- 1990, UK, Penguin, ISBN 9780140131512, August 1990, paperback, 320 pp
- 1992, US, HarperPaperbacks, ISBN 0-06-109091-3, July 1992, paperback, 400 pp
- 2001, UK, Penguin, ISBN 0-14-029455-4, 22 February 2001, paperback (new edition), 320 pp
- 2003, US, 2.13.61, ISBN 1-880985-72-1, 26 March 2003, paperback (2nd edition), 320 pp
- 2009, AUS, Penguin, ISBN 978-0-14-104561-0, 29 June 2009, paperback, 324 pp

== Readings ==
Cave did many public readings before and after the publication of the book, sometimes accompanied by various musicians. A selection of readings was released as a bonus 12" with the original release of the Tender Prey album: "Mah Sanctum", "Lamentation", "One Autumn" and "Animal Static". In 1998, Mute records released these same four chapters, together with music by Mick Harvey and Ed Clayton-Jones on CD as "And the Ass Saw the Angel" (EUCHRID1).
