= The Times They Are a-Changin' (Burl Ives album) =

Studio album by Burl Ives
- Released: 1968
- Genre: Folk
- Length: 33.02
- Label: Columbia
- Producer: Bob Johnston

Burl Ives chronology
| The Big Country Hits (1968) | The Times They Are a-Changin' (1968) | How Great Thou Art (1969) |

The Times They Are a-Changin' is a 1968 album by Burl Ives, produced by Bob Johnston. It was probably recorded at Columbia Studios in Nashville, with local session musicians. It features songs by Bob Dylan, Paul Simon, and Johnny Cash (all of whom had previously worked with Johnston), songs by Johnston's friend Charlie Daniels, plus other pop or country standards.

== Reception ==
Professional ratings
Review scores
| Source | Rating |
|---|---|
| Allmusic | 1.5/5 stars |

In his Allmusic review, critic Richie Unterberger heavily criticized the attempt at having Ives "go electric" as other folk musicians were at the time, calling the album the "most ludicrous" attempt. He wrote Ives' "voice was shaky, the arrangements bland MOR, and the whole enterprise a mesh of ill-fitting pieces. Nowhere is that more evident than in the title track, which devolves into a grandly intended spoken intonation of the lyrics that succeeds only in getting Ives to make a fool of himself."

In contrast, Billboard's reception at the time (not years later) was quite favorable: "His first Columbia single 'I'll Be Your Baby Tonight' leads off this parade of Ives renditions, as he's in fine voice on that and other recent pop hits. 'Little Green Apples,' 'Homeward Bound' and 'If I Were a Carpenter' are perfect for Ives style and feel."

== Track listing ==
1. "I'll Be Your Baby Tonight" (Bob Dylan) – 2:14
2. "By the Time I Get to Phoenix" (Jimmy Webb) – 3:10
3. "Gentle on My Mind" (John Hartford) – 2:52
4. "Little Green Apples" (Bobby Russell) – 2:45
5. "Don't Think Twice, It's All Right" (Dylan) – 3:10
6. "One Too Many Mornings" (Dylan) – 3:07
7. "Maria (If I Could)" (Charlie Daniels) – 2:56
8. "If I Were a Carpenter" (Tim Hardin) – 2:20
9. "Homeward Bound" (Paul Simon) – 2:45
10. "Folk Singer" (Johnny Cash, Charlie Daniels) – 3:09
11. "The Times They Are a-Changin'" (Dylan) – 5:17
