= Tender Prey =

Studio album by Nick Cave and the Bad Seeds
- Released: 19 September 1988
- Recorded: August–November 1987
- Studios: Vielklang Studios and Hansa Tonstudio (Berlin); Trident Studios and Strongroom Studios (London)
- Genres: Post-punk; gothic rock; garage punk; gothic country; blues
- Length: 49:19
- Label: Mute
- Producers: Flood; Tony Cohen; Nick Cave and the Bad Seeds

Nick Cave and the Bad Seeds chronology
Your Funeral... My Trial (1986)	Tender Prey (1988)	The Good Son (1990)

Singles from Tender Prey
- 1. "The Mercy Seat" Released: 23 May 1988; 2. "Deanna" Released: 5 September 1988

Professional ratings
Review scores
Source	Rating
AllMusic	4.5/5 stars
Drowned in Sound	9/10
NME	8/10
Paste	8.2/10
Q	3/5 stars
Record Mirror	4/5
The Rolling Stone Album Guide	4/5 stars
Spin Alternative Record Guide	7/10
Uncut	4/5 stars

Tender Prey is the fifth studio album by the Australian rock band Nick Cave and the Bad Seeds, released on 19 September 1988 by Mute Records. Produced by Flood, the album was recorded during several sessions over the course of four months in London and West Berlin (where the band were based at the time of its release) and dedicated to the Brazilian actor Fernando Ramos da Silva.

== Details ==
The album opens with "The Mercy Seat", which became one of Cave's signature songs and has been subsequently played at almost all of the band's live performances since 1988. "The Mercy Seat" was released as a single in May 1988 prior to the album's release and "Deanna" was released in September. On the CD version, the video mix of "The Mercy Seat" is also included as the last track. Johnny Cash, one of Cave's most important influence, recorded a version of the song on American III: Solitary Man (2000).

"Deanna" is loosely based on the Edwin Hawkins Singers version of the hymn "Oh Happy Day". Subsequently, Cave issued an acoustic version of a medley of both songs. Hawkins' version was later issued on the first volume of Original Seeds. "City of Refuge" is noted in the credit listing as being inspired by a Blind Willie Johnson song "I'm Gonna Run to the City of Refuge". This song was also later issued on Original Seeds.

Upon its release, Tender Prey received positive reviews and charted in the United Kingdom and Greece. However, the album failed to chart in either the band's native Australia or the United States Billboard charts. The album was remastered and reissued on 29 March 2010 as a collector's edition CD/DVD set and in October 2010. It was also listed in the book 100 Best Australian Albums, alongside The Boatman's Call (1997), in the Top 30.

Cave later said, "It was a nightmare, that record. It is reflective of a group—particularly myself—who was just writing songs and there was no larger idea behind it. Sometimes some of the group was there, sometimes they weren't. I hear bad production and I hear bad performances as well." Cave later admitted that the album, "was made at a difficult time in my life when things were spiralling out of control in a lot of areas."

In 2012, the album was added to the National Film and Sound Archive's Sounds of Australia.

== Track listing ==
All tracks are written by Nick Cave, except where noted.

No.	Title	Music	Words	Length
1.	"The Mercy Seat"	Cave; Mick Harvey	Cave	7:17
2.	"Up Jumped the Devil"	Cave; Harvey; Roland Wolf; Blixa Bargeld; Kid Congo Powers; Thomas Wydler	Cave	5:16
3.	"Deanna"			3:45
4.	"Watching Alice"			4:01
5.	"Mercy"	Cave; Harvey	Cave	6:22
6.	"City of Refuge"			4:48
7.	"Slowly Goes the Night"			5:23
8.	"Sunday's Slave"			3:40
9.	"Sugar Sugar Sugar"	Cave; Harvey	Cave	5:01
10.	"New Morning"			3:46
Total length:				49:19

CD bonus track
No.	Title	Music	Words	Length
11.	"The Mercy Seat" (video mix)	Cave; Harvey	Cave	5:05

Note: Early issues of the CD version of the album had a track indexing issue in which "Sunday's Slave" and "Sugar Sugar Sugar" were indexed as the same track.

== Personnel ==
Nick Cave and the Bad Seeds

- Nick Cave – vocals; Hammond organ (1, 3, 6, 7); harmonica (4–6); piano (4, 8, 10); tambourine (10); vibraphone (5)
- Mick Harvey – bass (2–10); backing vocals (1, 2, 5–7, 10); acoustic guitar (3, 6, 8–10); drums (3, 8, 10); percussion (6, 9); xylophone (2, 7); guitar (1); bass loops (1); piano (1); organ (10)
- Blixa Bargeld – guitar (2, 3, 6–8, 10); backing vocals (2, 5, 6, 10); slide guitar (1, 5)
- Roland Wolf – piano (2, 5, 7, 9); organ (6, 7); guitar (1); backing vocals (6)
- Kid Congo Powers – guitar (2, 3, 5, 6, 9); backing vocals (5, 6)
- Thomas Wydler – drums (1, 2, 4–7, 9); backing vocals (6)

Guests

- Hugo Race – guitar (4); backing vocals (5)
- Gini Ball – strings (1)
- Audrey Riley – strings (1)
- Chris Tombling – strings (1)
- Ian Davis – backing vocals (7)

== Chart positions ==
Chart (1988)	Peak position
UK Albums Chart	67
UK Independent Albums Chart	2

Chart (2025)	Peak position
Croatian International Albums (HDU)	16
