= The Folk Singer =

1968 song by Johnny Cash

- Spanish release picture sleeve

Single by Johnny Cash
- A-side: "Folsom Prison Blues"
- Released: April 1968
- Recorded: 1968
- Genre: Folk
- Length: 3:01
- Label: Columbia
- Songwriter(s): Charles E. Daniels, Johnny Cash

"The Folk Singer" is a folk song, written by Charles E. Daniels and American musician Johnny Cash and first recorded by Cash in 1968. It is also known as "Folk Singer" or, less often, "The Singer".

Allegedly about American pop singer Tommy Roe, "The Folk Singer" was first recorded in 1968 and released as a B-side on a 45 RPM live reissue of Cash's "Folsom Prison Blues" single in April 1968. Later recorded by Burl Ives (on the album, The Times They Are A-Changin') the same year and Glen Campbell (on the album, Try a Little Kindness) in 1970, the song reached a wider audience from these versions.

== Nick Cave and the Bad Seeds version (1986) ==
"The Singer"

Single by Nick Cave and the Bad Seeds

from the album Kicking Against the Pricks
- B-side: "Running Scared"/"Black Betty"
- Released: 16 June 1986
- Recorded: 1985
- Genre: Rock, folk rock
- Length: 3:08
- Label: Mute
- Songwriter(s): Charles E. Daniels, Johnny Cash
- Producer(s): Flood

Nick Cave and the Bad Seeds singles chronology
"Tupelo" (1985)	"The Singer" (1986)	"The Mercy Seat" (1988)

"The Folk Singer" was recorded by Australian post-punk group Nick Cave and the Bad Seeds in 1985, with a slightly altered lyric, under the title "The Singer." First released as a single in June 1986, the song later appeared on the band's third studio album, Kicking Against the Pricks, which was composed entirely of cover versions.

"The Singer" was performed live on all of the band's following tour dates throughout 1986—1989 and on a number of other occasions up until 2005.

=== Track listing ===
UK 7" (7 MUTE 47)

1. "The Singer" (Daniels, Cash) – 3:08
2. "Running Scared" (Roy Orbison, Joe Melson) –2:07

UK 12" (12 MUTE 47)

1. "The Singer" (Daniels, Cash) – 3:08
2. "Running Scared" (Orbison, Melson) – 2:07
3. "Black Betty" (Lead Belly) – 2:33

=== Personnel ===
Nick Cave and the Bad Seeds

- Nick Cave - vocals
- Mick Harvey - guitar, drums (on "Running Scared")
- Barry Adamson - bass
- Thomas Wydler - drums
- Hugo Race - guitar (on "Running Scared" and "Black Betty")
- Tracy Pew - bass (on "Running Scared" and "Black Betty")

Additional musicians

- The Berliner Kaffeehausmusik Ensemble - strings
- Gini Ball - strings (on "Running Scared")
- Martin McCarrick - strings (on "Running Scared")

Technical personnel

- Flood - producer, engineer
- Tony Cohen - co-producer, engineer
- Peter Gruchot - art direction, photography

=== Charts ===
Chart (1986)	Peak position
UK Indie Chart	1
