= Kicking Against the Pricks =

Studio album by Nick Cave and the Bad Seeds
- Released: 18 August 1986
- Length: 45:28
- Label: Mute
- Producers: Flood; Tony Cohen

Nick Cave and the Bad Seeds chronology
The Firstborn Is Dead (1985)	Kicking Against the Pricks (1986)	Your Funeral... My Trial (1986)

Singles from Kicking Against the Pricks
- 1. "The Singer" Released: 16 June 1986; 2. "Running Scared" / "Black Betty"

Professional ratings
Review scores
Source	Rating
AllMusic	4/5 stars
Pitchfork	8.2/10
Q	4/5 stars
Record Collector	4/5 stars
Record Mirror	4 1/2/5
The Rolling Stone Album Guide	3/5 stars
Sounds	5/5 stars
Spin Alternative Record Guide	8/10
Uncut	3/5 stars

Kicking Against the Pricks is the third studio album released by the Australian rock band Nick Cave and the Bad Seeds. First released in 1986, the album is a collection of Cave's interpretations of songs by other artists. The title is a reference to a biblical quote from the King James Version of the Christian Bible, Acts 26, verse 14.

The album marked the Bad Seeds debut of drummer Thomas Wydler, expanding the Bad Seeds line-up to Cave (vocals and keyboards), Wydler, bassist Barry Adamson, and guitarists Mick Harvey and Blixa Bargeld.

Cave would later downplay the importance of the record, but said it helped the band develop musically:

It allowed us to discover different elements, to actually make and perform a variety of different sorts of music successfully. I think that helped subsequent records tremendously.

Remarking on the song selection, Cave said:

They were all done for different reasons. Basically a list of songs were made and we tried to play them. We tried songs by the Loved Ones and the Saints and all sorts of people that never got on the record. Some songs were tributes, like the Tom Jones song ["Sleeping Annaleah"]; other songs we didn't think the song was ever done particularly well in the first place. Some songs had just kind of haunted my childhood, like "The Carnival Is Over", which I always loved.

The strings were arranged by Harvey and played by the Berliner Kaffeehausmusik Ensemble. "The Hammer Song" is not to be confused with the song of the same name from the Bad Seeds' sixth studio album The Good Son (1990).

Andrea Enthal in Spin described the album as '[it] has moments, but overall it's a dready, self-indulgent blob'.

The album was remastered and reissued on 27 April 2009 as a collector's edition CD/DVD set. The CD features the original 12-song vinyl LP's track listing, while "Black Betty" and "Running Scared" are featured as bonus audio tracks on the accompanying DVD.

Recordings of seven of these songs, performed by the original artists, were later issued on the Original Seeds compilation CDs.

== Track listing ==
=== Vinyl version ===
Side one
No.	Title	Writer(s)	Length
1.	"Muddy Water"	Phil Rosenthal	5:15
2.	"I'm Gonna Kill That Woman"	John Lee Hooker	3:44
3.	"Sleeping Annaleah"	Mickey Newbury; Dan Folger	3:18
4.	"Long Black Veil"	Danny Dill; Marijohn Wilkin	3:46
5.	"Hey Joe"	Billy Roberts	3:56
6.	"The Singer"	Johnny Cash; Charlie Daniels	3:09
Total length:			23:08

Side two
No.	Title	Writer(s)	Length
7.	"All Tomorrow's Parties"	Lou Reed	5:52
8.	"By the Time I Get to Phoenix"	Jimmy Webb	3:39
9.	"The Hammer Song"	Alex Harvey	3:50
10.	"Something's Gotten Hold of My Heart"	Roger Greenaway, Roger Cook	3:44
11.	"Jesus Met the Woman at the Well"	Traditional	2:00
12.	"The Carnival Is Over"	Tom Springfield	3:16
Total length:			22:21

CD version
No.	Title	Writer(s)	Length
1.	"Muddy Water"	Phil Rosenthal	5:15
2.	"I'm Gonna Kill That Woman"	John Lee Hooker	3:44
3.	"Sleeping Annaleah"	Mickey Newbury; Dan Folger	3:18
4.	"Long Black Veil"	Danny Dill; Marijohn Wilkin	3:46
5.	"Hey Joe"	Billy Roberts	3:56
6.	"The Singer"	Johnny Cash; Charlie Daniels	3:09
7.	"Black Betty"	Leadbelly	2:33
8.	"Running Scared"	Roy Orbison; Joe Melson	2:06
9.	"All Tomorrow's Parties"	Lou Reed	5:52
10.	"By the Time I Get to Phoenix"	Jimmy Webb	3:39
11.	"The Hammer Song"	Alex Harvey	3:50
12.	"Something's Gotten Hold of My Heart"	Roger Greenaway; Roger Cook	3:44
13.	"Jesus Met the Woman at the Well"	Traditional, arranged by the Alabama Singers	2:00
14.	"The Carnival Is Over"	Tom Springfield	3:16
Total length:			50:07

=== Track listing errors ===
Some of the songs were re-titled (possibly through error), and one was miscredited, as follows:
1. "Muddy Water" by Phil Rosenthal. On the Cave LP the song is credited to John Bundrick, who wrote a song of the same title, recorded by the band Free. Previously recorded by the Seldom Scene, and Johnny Cash.
3. "Sleeping Annaleah" is the song "Weeping Annaleah", previously recorded by Tom Jones.
6. "The Singer" is the song "The Folk Singer", previously recorded by Tommy Roe, Johnny Cash, Glen Campbell, and Burl Ives.
7. "Black Betty" is actually three songs recorded by Leadbelly as a medley: "Looky Looky Yonder/Black Betty/Yellow Women's Doorbells".
12. "The Carnival Is Over" was not co-written by Frank Farian; this credit appears as a consequence of his creating an extra verse for Boney M.'s cover version of the song.
13. "Jesus Met the Woman at the Well" is credited as "traditional, arranged the Alabama Singers". While this song was recorded by the Alabama Singers, it follows the arrangement of an earlier recording by the Pilgrim Travelers, which is credited as "traditional, arranged J. W. Alexander".

== Personnel ==
Credits adapted from the vinyl album's liner notes.

- Nick Cave – lead vocals (1–12); organ (1, 5); piano interior (1); engineer (mixes)
- Blixa Bargeld – guitar (1, 2, 7–9, 12); co-lead vocals (7, 11, 12); slide guitar (3, 4); backing vocals (4); engineer (mixes)
- Mick Harvey – piano (1, 3, 5, 7, 8, 10, 11); backing vocals (1, 3, 4, 10); co-lead vocals (7, 11, 12); guitar (6, 7, 11); acoustic guitar (3, 4); drums (2, 5); snare (4, 9); organ (9); vibes (10); bass (2); string arrangements; engineer (mixes)
- Barry Adamson – bass (1, 3, 4, 6–12); backing vocals (1, 3, 4, 10); co-lead vocals (11, 12)
- Thomas Wydler – drums (1, 3, 6–12); percussion (4); engineer (mixes)
- Dawn Cave – violin (1)
- Hugo Race – guitar (2, 4, 5, 11)
- Tracy Pew – bass (5)
- Rowland S. Howard – co-lead vocals (7); guitar; organ (8)
- Berliner Kaffeehausmusik Ensemble – strings
- Tony Cohen – engineer (all backing tracks)
- Flood – engineer (mixes)
- Svein Taits – engineer (mixes - assistant)
- Tom Frederikse – engineer (mixes - assistant)

== Chart positions ==
Chart (1986)	Peak position
UK Albums Chart	89
UK Independent Albums Chart	1
