= King Ink =

Book by Nick Cave

- First edition cover, 1988
- Author: Nick Cave
- Language: English
- Genre: Poetry, lyrics, plays
- Publisher: Black Spring Press
- Publication date: 1988
- Publication place: United Kingdom
- Media type: Print (hardback)
- Pages: 193
- ISBN: 1-880985-08-X
- Followed by: King Ink II

King Ink is a collection of poetry, lyrics, plays and writings by Australian musician and author Nick Cave. It was first published in the United Kingdom by Black Spring Press in 1988.

== Other editions ==
King Ink was also published in Japan and Italy in 1988. The Japanese version contains pictures and illustrations. In 1993, it was published in the United States by 2.13.61.

Translated versions of King Ink have also been published. German translations were done by Peter Selinka Verlag in 1992 and Czech translations were published by Mata, under the title Král Smírák. Italian versions are titled Re Inkiostro, Spanish versions are titled Canciones y Prosa – King Ink, and Greek and French translations also exist.
