= Sean O'Hagan (journalist) =

Newspaper critic of photography and music

Sean O'Hagan is an Irish writer for The Guardian and The Observer, his specialty being photography.

== Early life and education ==
O'Hagan was brought up in Armagh, Northern Ireland, during "The Troubles", and has written about the experience. As an undergraduate, he studied English in London.

== Career ==
He began his media career as a writer for NME, The Face and Arena, and during this period became interested in photography. As of 2013, he is one of six regular "Art and design" critics for The Guardian website, and the only photography critic among the six.

O'Hagan is a nominator for the Prix Pictet Award in photography and sustainability. (Note: For the Prix Pictet nominators, see Nominators: Prix Pictet, prixpictet.com; accessed 21 January 2014.)

The term "new lad" was coined by O'Hagan in a 1993 article in Arena.

On 18 March 2003, O'Hagan received the 2002 British Press Award for Interviewer of the Year. (Note: The award is often described as having been for 2003; as an example, see "British Press Awards: Past winners", PressGazette.co.uk, 29 November 2007. Retrieved 19 January 2014.) In 2011, O'Hagan was the sole recipient of the J. Dudley Johnston Award (Note: For the J Dudley Johnston Award, see J Dudley Johnston Award, Royal Photographic Society website. Retrieved 19 January 2014.) from the Royal Photographic Society "for major achievement in the field of photographic criticism".

== Publications ==
=== Books paired with one other ===
- Faith, Hope, and Carnage. Edinburgh: Canongate, 2022. With Nick Cave.

=== Books with contributions by O'Hagan ===
- Everything was Moving: Photography from the 60s and 70s. London: Barbican Art Gallery, 2012. ISBN 9780946372393. Edited by Kate Bush and Gerry Badger. O'Hagan contributes the essays "The unreal everyday: William Eggleston's America" and "Against detachment: Bruce Davidson's photographs of America during the Civil Rights Era".
