= The Death of Bunny Munro =

Book by Nick Cave

- Canongate Books 1st edition front cover
- Author: Nick Cave
- Language: English
- Genre: Black comedy, Absurd, Philosophical novel
- Publisher: Canongate Books (UK); Faber & Faber (US)
- Publication date: September 2009
- Publication place: United Kingdom
- Pages: 304
- ISBN: 1-84767-376-7
- OCLC: 373483558
- LC Class: PR9619.3.C4 D43 2009
- Preceded by: And the Ass Saw the Angel

The Death of Bunny Munro is a 2009 novel written by Nick Cave, best known as the lead vocalist of Nick Cave and the Bad Seeds. It is his second novel, the first being And the Ass Saw the Angel, published in 1989.

== Synopsis ==
The novel deals with Bunny Munro, a middle-aged lothario, whose constant womanising and alcohol abuse comes to a head after his wife's suicide. A travelling door-to-door beauty-product salesman, he and his son go on an increasingly out-of-control road trip around Brighton, over which looms the shadow of a serial killer making his way towards Brighton, as well as Bunny's own mortality. The novel is set in Brighton in 2003, around the time the West Pier was destroyed by fire.

Many of the locations and street names used in the book relate to real places close to Cave's own home.

== Release ==
The novel was also released as an audiobook, using a 3D audio effect, produced and sound-directed by British artists Iain Forsyth and Jane Pollard, with a soundtrack by Nick Cave and Warren Ellis, and in a number of e-book formats, including an iPhone application that synchronised the audiobook with the text and included exclusive videos of Cave reading. A series of live events took place in late 2009 to promote the book under the title of "A Night with Nick Cave", combining music, readings and a Q&A session with the audience.

== Television adaptation ==
In November 2023, a six-part television series adaptation of the novel was announced by Sky Studios with Matt Smith playing Bunny.

== Reception ==
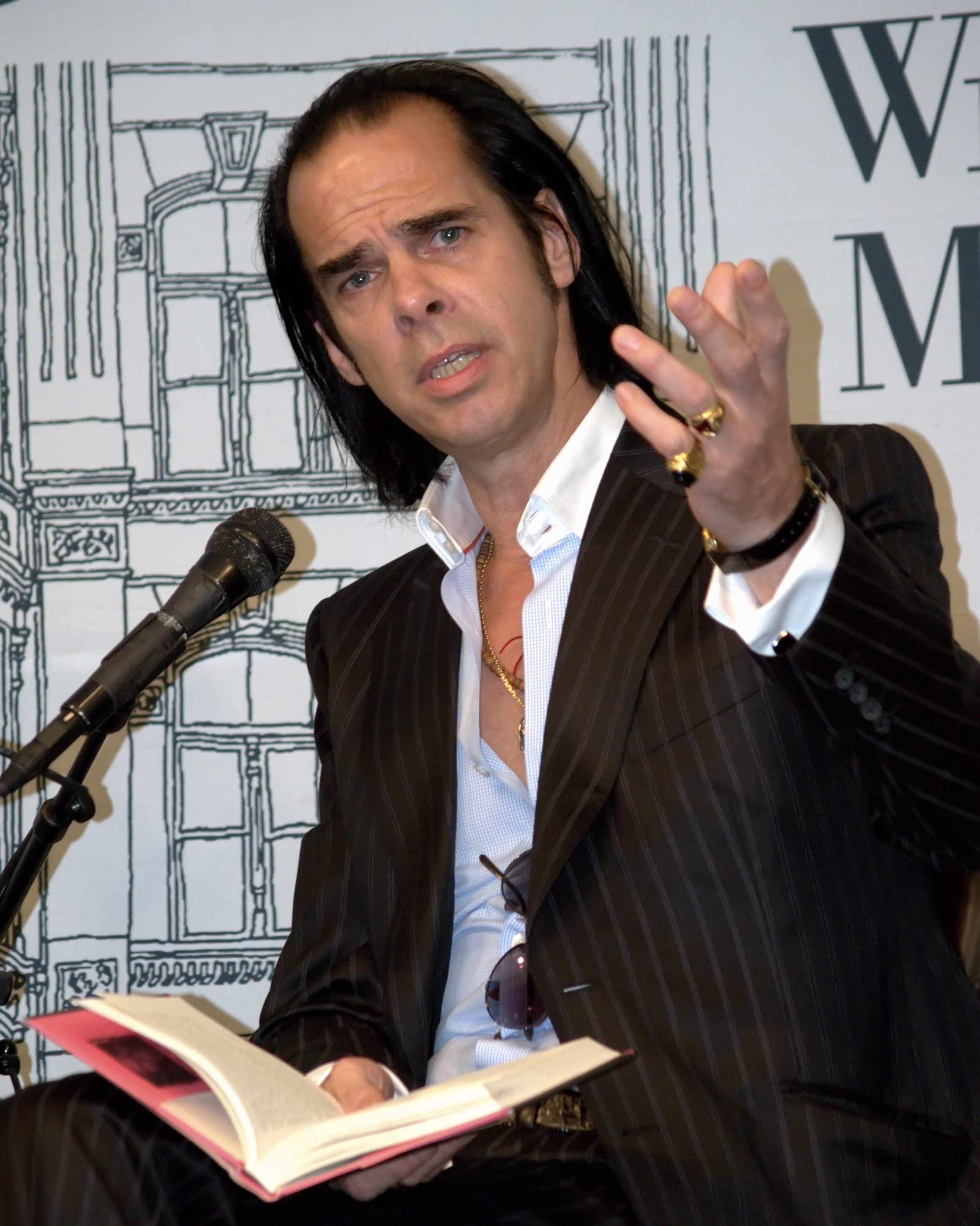
Cave reading from The Death of Bunny Munro in New York City, 2009

Irvine Welsh, Neil LaBute and David Peace have all touted the novel, providing back-cover reviews. Moreover, The Death of Bunny Munro has received strong reviews from the British media: Graeme Thomson (writing in The Observer, 6 September 2009) awarded the novel 4 stars out of 5. Likewise, the Saturday Times (on 5 September 2009) stated, in a very positive review, that the novel "reads like a good indie movie".

The novel was nominated for the Literary Review's Bad Sex in Fiction Award but did not win.

== Publication history ==
- 2009, UK, Canongate Books, ISBN 978-1-84767-376-3, 3 September 2009, hardcover, 304pp
- 2009, US, Faber & Faber, ISBN 978-0-86547-910-4, 1 September 2009, hardcover, 288 pp
