= Black Spring Press =

British publisher

- Founded: 1984
- Country of origin: United Kingdom
- Headquarters location: London
- Distribution: BookSource; Simon & Schuster (North America)
- Publication types: Books
- Official website: blackspringpressgroup.com

Black Spring Press is an independent English publishing house founded in the early 1980s.

The first Black Spring publication was a reprint of Anaïs Nin's D. H. Lawrence: An Unprofessional Study, which on its first publication in 1932 had been only the second study of Lawrence's work to appear. This was followed by Patrick J. Kearney's The Paris Olympia Press: An Annotated Bibliography, which carried a foreword by Maurice Girodias.

Later publications included translations of early Soviet short stories and an epistolary first novel from the French; Nick Cave's debut novel, And the Ass Saw the Angel, which had been commissioned five years previously; reprints of Leonard Cohen's novels together with new editions of his titles Book of Mercy and Death of a Lady's Man; and the memoirs of Carolyn Cassady, Off the Road: Twenty Years with Cassady, Kerouac and Ginsberg.

In the early 1990s Black Spring revived the reputation of the black comedy thriller writer Kyril Bonfiglioli by gathering his three previously published novels featuring art dealer and bon viveur Charlie Mortdecai and issuing them as The Mortdecai Trilogy; this was followed by a reprint of Bonfiglioli's historical romp All the Tea in China and first publication of The Great Mortdecai Moustache Mystery, left lacking its final chapter at the time of the author's death but now completed by Craig Brown.

In 2001 the company was acquired by Robert Hastings, under whose proprietorship it continued to publish original fiction and nonfiction, as well as successfully reviving work by Patrick Hamilton, Alexander Baron and Julian Maclaren-Ross.

Black Spring Press was acquired in 2018 by a new owner and now forms part of The Black Spring Press Group.
