= Adam Steiner =

British author

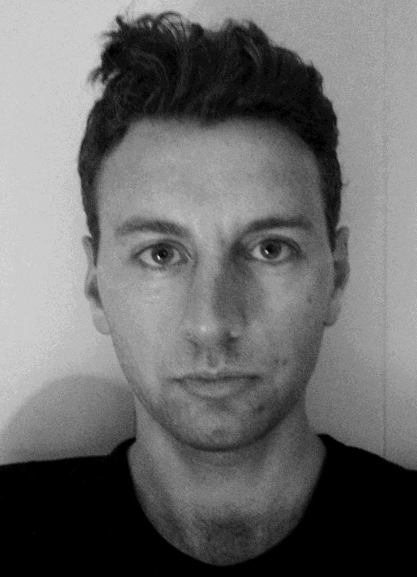
- Occupation: Author

Adam Steiner is an author who has written books on Nine Inch Nails, David Bowie and Nick Cave. Steiner has published poetry, fiction, and non-fiction. He co-founded the independent publisher Silhouette Press in 2013, and was the creative producer of the Disappear Here poetry film project in 2015.

== Career ==
=== Silhouette Press ===
In 2013 Steiner co-founded and co-managed Silhouette Press, an independent publisher and social enterprise in Coventry alongside his business partner, Gary Sykes-Blythe. It was the publisher of Here Comes Everyone magazine which was still running and active in Coventry as of 2016, managed by the poet Raef Boylan, who also runs Fire & Dust poetry evenings in the city.

=== Coventry-Cork Poetry Exchange ===
In 2014, Steiner was selected to represent Coventry in the twin-city Coventry-Cork poetry exchange alongside Saleha Begum. Visiting the Republic of Ireland and performing his poetry in Cork, Kerry and Limerick with the Obheal poetry organisation.

=== Disappear Here ===
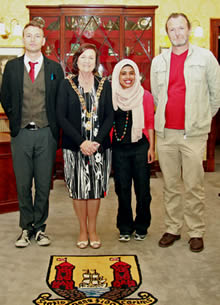
Coventry-Cork Poetry Exchange 2014 - L-R: Adam Steiner, Lord Mayor Cllr. Mary Shields, Saleha Begum, and Paul Casey.

In 2015, a group of nine writers and nine film-makers, led by Coventry artist Adam Steiner, created a series of poetry films about the ring road. Titled Disappear Here, the project was funded with grants from Arts Council England and Coventry City Council and was used as part of Coventry's successful bid for the status of UK City of Culture 2021. In interviews with the BBC and the Guardian, Steiner commented that "it is the duty of artists and citizens to engage with issues of public space, control of architecture and the human experience of our built environment" and cited the ring road as having a "great presence, not dissimilar to the old city walls". He also said that driving on the road was reminiscent of a driving a Scalextric toy car.

Steiner was also interviewed by BBC news programme, Midlands Today: "Coventry Ring Road is one of the city's most iconic and notorious physical landmarks, acting as both city wall, orbital conduit and dividing line. I feel the ring road deserves to be celebrated as well as criticised – it is the duty of artists and citizens to engage with issues of public space, control of architecture and the human experience of our built environment, to shine a light on the fantastic, the boring and the universal in the everyday."

Steiner was interviewed by the Financial Times regarding the political future of Coventry: "It's a love-hate thing," said Adam Steiner, a local artist, who describes Coventry as "an underdog city" whose residents are "used to being kicked around".

== Books ==
=== Politics of The Asylum ===
Urbane Publications, 2018: A novel which presents a fictionalized perspective on the decline of the NHS, told from the viewpoint of the protagonist, Nathan Finewax, based upon Steiner's own experiences working as a hospital cleaner. The novel is constructed of vignettes where Finewax gives an account of the patients that he meets on the ward. The novel is noted for its modernist experiments with form, surreal imagery and stream-of consciousness prose style.

=== Into The Never: Nine Inch Nails and The Creation of The Downward Spiral ===
Bloomsbury Publishing PLC, 2020: the book explores the creation and cultural significance of Nine Inch Nails' influential 1994 album, The Downward Spiral. It examines the themes of trauma and depression in the album and connects them to wider cultural events, such as the Columbine school shooting in 1999 and the subsequent media fallout.

The book was noted for its exploration of the relationship between heavy metal music and mental health, which Steiner discussed in an interview with the mental health charity, Heavy Metal Therapy. The book also explores the concept-album format of The Downward Spiral, as it has been compared to Pink Floyd's The Wall, a direct inspiration for Trent Reznor in writing the album.

=== Darker with the Dawn: Nick Cave's Songs of Love and Death ===
Published by Bloomsbury Publishing in 2023, this non-fiction book explores the life and music of Nick Cave and his band, The Bad Seeds. It covers his journey from his childhood in Australia, his inspirations, and his songwriting evolution over four decades. Rupert Loydell wrote of the book's investigation of Nick Cave's "creative antagonism", describing it as a force that drives his songwriting and sometimes hostile stage-presence.

=== Silhouettes and Shadows: The Secret History of David Bowie's Scary Monsters (And Super Creeps) ===
Bloomsbury Publishing PLC, 2023: Steiner's book dives into the making and cultural impact of David Bowie's 1980 album Scary Monsters (and Super Creeps). It provides context on Bowie's personal and professional life during this pivotal period of his career. The book focuses upon the recording of the album in the social and political era, marking the shift into the Conservative party control of the UK, with Margaret Thatcher as Prime Minister and Ronald Reagan's tenure as president of the United States of America.

Louder Than War called the book: "an in-depth discussion of David Bowie's last great album", citing its thorough coverage of studio techniques, philosophy and politics.

== Bibliography ==
- Politics of The Asylum. Urbane Publications, 2018.
- Into The Never: Nine Inch Nails and The Creation of the Downward Spiral. Backbeat, 2020. ISBN 978-1617137310.
- Darker with the Dawn: Nick Cave's Songs of Love and Death. Bloomsbury Publishing PLC, 2023
- Silhouettes and Shadows: The Secret History of David Bowie's Scary Monsters (And Super Creeps). Bloomsbury Publishing PLC, 2023.
