= Love Is the Only Master I'll Serve =

2006 art film by Nicholas Lens

love is the only master I'll serve
- A promotional poster for the film
- Directed by: Nicholas Lens
- Written by: Nicholas Lens
- Produced by: Nicholas Lens (executive producer: Brigitte Baudine)
- Starring: Louise Peterhoff; Claron McFadden; Clara-lane Lens
- Cinematography: Renaat Lambeets
- Edited by: Simone Rau, Stefan Rijcken
- Music by: Nicholas Lens
- Release date: June 2006
- Running time: 22 min
- Language: Swedish / English / Latin

love is the only master I'll serve is a symbolical art film (22') written and directed by Nicholas Lens.

== Festival selections ==
- (World premiere) Brooklyn International Film Festival, New York City - June 2006
- Media and Dance, Tokyo – Japan, 2006
- Napolidanza, Italy, 2006
- The American Dance Festival, United States, 2006
- Media and Dance, Tokyo – Japan, 2020 (Best Selection)

== Plot ==
One entity, divided into two women, addresses himself to an imaginary love-god represented by a pipe-smoking child. The body and voice of the divided entity are used to utter a spectrum of opposed sensations - caused by the division - and heightened sensitiveness related to the subject. The divided entity is seeking a unification, which will not happen without the approval and support of the imaginary love-god.

== Characters ==
(Reference for this paragraph Festival program BIFF New York City 2006)

- The Whisper Kid, symbolizes a personalized love-god.
  - she looks with a certain distance and neutrality at the two creatures who address themselves to her;
  - her image is of pureness and young innocence;
  - to cut across this well-spread definition she smokes a big curled hanging pipe;
  - sometimes she blows and creates air bubbles of soap with the inhaled smoke;
  - by these actions the child character reveals a mysterious, elusive background of her own timelessness, of someone who could possibly be aged but appears this time in a gentle, different form.
- Luna, a human female mortal addressing herself indirectly (and sometimes directly) to the imaginary love-god.
  - she figures as a sculpture, perplexed by the whisper kid, but finally she looks straight in a static camera while she sings her ode to love, she expresses her devotion to the subject ("love is the only master I'll serve") by her self-chosen verbal communication;
  - her body almost does not move, we only see a severe, sometimes frightened, sometimes completely desperate-for-love face expression.
- Serena, a human female mortal, addresses herself indirectly (and sometimes directly) to the imaginary love-god.
  - she communicates her devotion to the subject by physical expression;
  - she dances, using a whole spectrum of facial and body statements, interrupted with spasmodic blitzes of short falling moves and/or like electric shocks, like face and body are crying of pain and uncontrolled passion originated by the subject (as it appears sometimes when long periods of a constant energetic and inner peaceful mood is suddenly effected from outside, unexpectedly and on first sight unnecessary, like the pain of a needle in a body which is in a gentle, lovely sleeping state, a pain, abrupt and short, but more hurting, much deeper as one isn’t prepared for it).

== Credits Production ==
- Written and directed by Nicholas Lens

Cast

- Louise Peterhoff - Serena
- Claron McFadden - Luna
- Clara-Lane Lens - The Whisper Kid

Crew

- Photography and camera - Renaat Lambeets
- Choreography - Louise Peterhoff
- Music and libretto - Nicholas Lens
- Art director - Pierre-François Limbosch
- Editing - Simone Rau
- Additional editing - Stefan Rijcken
- Location - Karnak room, Axel Vervoordt, Wijnegem, Belgium
- Shooting days - April 16–17, 2005
- Executive producer - Brigitte Baudine
- Presented by Tabaran Company
- Produced by Nicholas Lens

== Soundtrack ==
Music production:
The Accacha Chronicles 3rd part, Amor Aeternus - Hymns of Love, Nicholas Lens

Soloists

- Claron McFadden, Ian Honeyman, Henk Lauwers, Derek Lee Ragin, Elka Simeonova, Galya Haralambieva, Paul Gérimon, Clara-Lane Lens, Angelite -Bulgarian Voices

Recording and mixing

- Acoustic studios - Sofia, Tabaran Studio - Brussels, ICP - Brussels, Villaïda - Casablanca, Bleu Nuit - Brussels, villalou - Cape Town
- Distributed by Sony BMG Classics (CD 82876 66238 2, 2005)
- Published by Schott Music International, Mainz/New York City
