= Babs (2000 film) =

- Theatrical release poster
- Directed by: Irma Achten
- Written by: Irma Achten
- Produced by: Kees Kasander
- Starring: Brigitte Kaandorp; Michel Van Dousselaere; John Buijsman
- Cinematography: Reinier van Brummelen
- Edited by: Marina Bodbijl; Chris Wyatt
- Music by: Bolland & Bolland
- Production companies: The Kasander Film Company; Delux Productions; NPS
- Distributed by: Buena Vista International
- Release date: 6 December 2000
- Running time: 90 minutes
- Country: Netherlands
- Language: Dutch

Babs is a 2000 Dutch musical comedy film written and directed by Irma Achten. It is the debut of cabaret performer Brigitte Kaandorp in a film, a long-held dream came true for her in which she incorporated singing and acting into the role. The film was shot in its entirety in Rotterdam.

== Cast ==
- Brigitte Kaandorp as Babs/Karla
- John Buijsman as Inspecteur
- Michel Van Dousselaere as Juan Carlos
- Cecile Heuer as Fritsie
- Wivineke van Groningen as Deense vrouw
- Naomi Colombaioni as Geert

== Home media ==
The film was released on VHS as a rental on 12 June 2001 and a stand-alone release on 5 December by Buena Vista Home Entertainment.
