= Henk Lauwers =

Belgian singer

Henk Lauwers is a classical baritone singer (lyric baritone), born in Ypres, Belgium in 1956.

As a very young boy soprano Lauwers performed under direction of Benjamin Britten his War Requiem. Later he studied classical flute but gained international fame as a classical baritone singer. One of his most notable performances has been his live interpretation of Eight Songs for a Mad King by Peter Maxwell Davies directed by Ian Burton in a Muziektheater Transparant production.

== Performances ==
- "Maria de Buenos Aires", Ástor Piazzolla, tango-operita with Rudolf Werthen, Covent Garden Festival 2000, Hong Kong Arts Festival 2001, Chiang Kai-shek, Taiwan 2002, L'Arsénal, Metz 2004 and L'Opéra, Avignon
- "Flamma Flamma", Nicholas Lens, Contemporary Art Museum, Cologne, chamber version with Frank Sheppard, Zeger Vandersteene, Gudrun Vercampt, Geert Callaert
- "Je Pleure des Bananes", Arne Sierens
- "Torre de Canela", Federico García Lorca – Hans Rotman with Sinfonietta Nova Arnstadt and Opera Mobile, Weimar, Düsseldorf
- "Cantate aux étoiles", André Waignien
- "Jonker Lichthart", Jef Van Hoof
- "Weihnachtsoratorium", Bach, I Fiamminghi
- "Ulrike", Raoul Desmet
- "De Grote Verzoeking van Sint-Antonius", Louis De Meester
- "Welp-Urt", opera, Johan Desmet
- "Ikh bin keyn eydes nit gevezn," ("The Puppet Designer"), Nicholas Lens with Rudolf Werthen, I Fiamminghi, Paradiso, Amsterdam
- "Don Giovanni", Mozart, I Fiamminghi
- "L'Inganno Felice", Rossini, stage direction Harry Kümmel
- "Empedocles' Turm", Cees Nooteboom, Hans Rotman with Sinfonia Amsterdam, Angermuseum in Erfurt
- "Des Esels Schatten", Richard Strauss, Opera Mobile
- "Terra Terra", Nicholas Lens, Hamburg with The Stuttgarter Kammerorchester, Claron McFadden, LaVerne Williams, Frank Sheppard, Le Mystère des Voix Bulgares
- "8 songs for a Mad King," Peter Maxwell Davies with Transparent, Prometheus, Etienne Siebens, Ian Burton

== Awards ==
- Prize Alpaerts for Chamber Music
- Prize Emmu Luart
- Finalist Bellini-concours
- Prize Victor Ligley 1997 for contribution to contemporary work

== Recordings ==
(labels Antler, Naxos, Erato, Classic Talent, Sony BMG, Ariola Classic)

- "Het Iepersch Liedboek" (Songbook from Ypres)
- "Musiques pour Marie-Thérèse", M.A. Charpentier
- "Orrori dell’Amore", Nicholas Lens with Claron McFadden
- "Manon Lescaut," Puccini
- "Torre de Canela", García Lorca
- "De Grote Verzoeking van Sint-Antonius", Louis De Meester,
- "The Accacha Chronicles", Nicholas Lens with Derek Lee Ragin, Claron McFadden, Ian Honeyman, Jean-Paul Fauchécourt
- 'Wilt thou be my dearie", Leopold Kozeluch with Diane Andersen, pianoforte.

== Sources ==
- Muziekcentrum Vlaanderen, Biography: Henk Lauwers (in Dutch)
- McCants, Clyde T., Opera for libraries: a guide to core works, audio and video recordings, books and serials, McFarland, 2003. ISBN 0-7864-1442-1
