= Achten =

Achten is a surname. Notable people with the surname include:

- Irma Achten (born 1956), Dutch film director and writer
- Nicolas Achten (born 1985), Belgian conductor, singer, lutenist, and harpist
- Roger Achten (1927–2004), Belgian fencer
