= Jonathan Levi =

American writer and producer (born 1955)

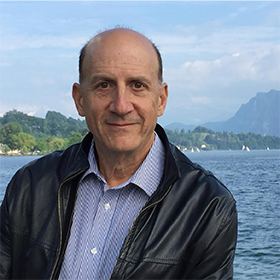
- Levi in 2016
- Born: 1955 (age 70–71); New York City, U.S.
- Education: Yale University; Clare College, Cambridge University
- Occupations: writer and producer

Jonathan Levi (born 1955) is an American writer and producer.

== Biography ==
Levi was born in New York City in 1955.

Following graduation from Yale University in 1977, Levi received a Mellon Fellowship to study at Clare College, Cambridge, where he revived the literary magazine Granta with Bill Buford and Pete de Bolla, and served as U.S. Editor until 1987.

After leaving Granta, Levi created the program "New Opera for New Ears" for the Metropolitan Opera Guild, producing Carly Simon's opera, Romulus Hunt (1991), directed by Francesca Zambello at the Metropolitan Opera Guild and the Kennedy Center.

Levi's 1992 book, A Guide for the Perplexed is a novel in the form of a traveler's guide in the form of letters to a mysterious, seemingly ubiquitous travel agent named Benjamin from two stranded but eventually satisfied customers, and was called "a fable of fantastical lushness, reminiscent of the best fairy tales" by the New York Times. His short stories and articles have appeared in many magazines including The International Herald Tribune, "Condé Nast Traveler", "GQ". Levi's The Lori Berenson Papers, written with Peruvian journalist Liz Mineo for The Nation (September 4, 2000) was attacked by Berenson's lawyer, former Attorney General Ramsey Clark. From 1996 to 2001, Levi served as the Fiction Critic for the Los Angeles Times Book Review.

In 1997 Levi commissioned Poet Laureate Robert Pinsky and Director Robert Scanlan and produced an adaptation of Pinsky's translation of Dante's Inferno with actors Bill Camp, Reg E. Cathey, Jack Willis and Leslie Beatty, with violinist Gil Morgenstern playing an original score written by Bruce Saylor. After premiering in New York, the production toured the United States including performances at Martin Luther King, Jr.'s Dexter Avenue Baptist Church and The Getty Center in Los Angeles.

In 2000 Harold O. Levy, the New York City Schools Chancellor, invited Levi to oversee Arts and Cultural Affairs, where he initiated a variety of programs to reinvigorate the arts, including a master class for School Superintendents with violinist Isaac Stern. In association with the Robin Hood Foundation, Levi initiated the Library Project to re-imagine and re-design the 600 elementary school libraries in New York City.

In 2002, Levi became the first director of the Richard B. Fisher Center for the Performing Arts at Bard College, designed by Frank Gehry, and created the SummerScape Festival, where his premieres included work by Russian director Kama Ginkas, the Merce Cunningham Dance Company, Ballet Hispanico, and Elvis Costello.

In 2001 Levi's first opera, The Scrimshaw Violin, held its world premiere, with music by Bruce Saylor. It was the first project of the Nine Circles Chamber Theatre, which Levi founded with violinist Gil Morgenstern. Levi subsequently wrote two more operas for Nine Circles with composer Mel Marvin. Guest from the Future (2004), about the legendary 1945 meeting in Leningrad of poet Anna Akhmatova and philosopher Isaiah Berlin, premiered at the SummerScape Festival, directed by David Chambers. Buwalsky: A Road Opera, based on an unfilmed scenario by Irma Achten, was commissioned by the Dutch Opera Spanga and directed by Corina van Eijk. Opera Spanga also commissioned Levi's Stuyvesant Zero with music by Dutch composer Caroline Ansink, which premiered on August 22, 2012.

Levi's 2009 drama Falling Bodies, with music by Bruce Saylor, imagines a meeting between Galileo Galilei and Primo Levi and premiered at the Rustaveli National Theatre in Tbilisi, Georgia.

Levi's latest novel, Septimania, released in April 2016 by Overlook Press, follows a shy young organ tuner who falls in love with a mysterious math genius, Louiza, only to find she has disappeared. While trying to find her, he discovers he is the heir to the Kingdom of Septimania, given by Charlemagne to the Jews in the 8th century. Over the next 50 years, Malory's search for Louiza leads to encounters with Aldo Moro, Pope John Paul II, a band of lost Romanians, a magical Bernini statue, Haroun Al-Rashid of Arabian Nights fame and an elephant that changes color, a shadowy U.S. spy agency and one of the 9/11 hijackers, an appleseed from the original Tree of Knowledge and the secret history of Isaac Newton and his discovery of a Grand Unified Theory that explains everything. But most of all, Septimania is the quest of a Candide for love and knowledge, and the ultimate discovery that they may be unified after all. Jen Baker at Booklist gave Septimania a starred review, calling it "a literary dream of a book" and "a storyteller's work of magic, and a fantastically suspenseful adventure" and compares it to Michael Chabon and Jonathan Franzen. Kirkus Reviews calls Septimania a "thoroughly intellectual postmodern fable, wise yet melancholy, meant to be read slowly and savored." In a recent Publishers Weekly review, Septimania was described as "highly intelligent, insanely ambitious, and restlessly imaginative."
