= Orrori dell'Amore =

Orrori dell'Amore (Was hast du mit meinem Herz getan?)

Soundtrack album by Nicholas Lens
- Released: 1995
- Genre: Contemporary classical / Soundtrack
- Label: Sony Classical
- Producer: Nicholas Lens

Orrori dell'Amore or Was hast du mit meinem Herz getan? is the original soundtrack of the film Marie Antoinette is Not Dead, written & directed by Irma Achten, produced by 'Kees Kasander and Dennis Wigman, with an orchestral songbook (orchestral lieder) for vocal soloists and chamber orchestra by Nicholas Lens.

== Credits ==
- Music & artistic producer: Nicholas Lens
- Lyrics: Nicholas Lens - Irma Achten
- Published by Schott Music International Mainz
- Production: Tabaran Company
- Soloists: Claron McFadden, soprano / Henk Lauwers, baritone / Gary Boyce, counter
- Originally released by Sony BMG International SK 62016
- Currently not distributed anymore

== Use ==
- "Was hast du mit meinem Herz getan?" (Mutter-Tour, 2001 and Live aus Berlin-Tour, 1998, Rammstein).
  The 12th track from Nicholas Lens' Orrori dell'Amore called Was hast du mit meinem Herz getan? was used as outro-song by the German hard rock band Rammstein at the end of all concerts of the Live aus Berlin-Tour, 1998, the Mutter-Tour, 2001 and on the DVD and CD Live aus Berlin of Rammstein.
- Marie Antoinette is niet dood (long feature film 1996)
  Orrori dell'Amore is the soundtrack of the film "Marie Antoinette is not dead," written & directed by Irma Achten, produced by 'Kees Kasander / Dennis Wigman. The film premiered at the International Film Festival Rotterdam on July 4, 1996.

== Track listing ==
=== 1995 original release ===
1. Orrori dell'Amore (07:20)
2. The Desire for the Blue World (03:43)
3. La Generosita dei Vita (06:39)
4. The Alpenwaltz (03:12)
5. The Queen's Body (02:46)
6. Desiderando (06:27)
7. Waa wee (03:43)
8. Le Roi est Mort, Vive le Roi (04:10)
9. Les Paysannes Royales (03:11)
10. Ein adliches Geschlecht (05:58)
11. The Emperor (04:03)
12. Was hast du mit meinem Herz getan? (04:46)
13. Orrori dell'Amore (07:22)
