= The Accacha Chronicles =

Compilation album by Nicholas Lens
- Released: 2005
- Genre: Contemporary classical
- Length: 224:20
- Label: Sony BMG
- Producer: Nicholas Lens

The Accacha Chronicles is an operatic trilogy by Nicholas Lens (2005) for soprano, tenor, countertenor, mezzo, baritone, bass male actor, small choir, mixed choir and chamber orchestra.

== Reception ==
Lens' publication of The Accacha Chronicles (published by Schott Music International, Mainz/New York City) earned him international acclaim. It may be Lens' most important and famous work.

== Structure ==
The Accacha Chronicles consists of three parts:

- Part I: Flamma Flamma - The Fire Requiem (1994) (BMG Classics 74321 697172 - Sony Classical (SK 66293)
- Part II: Terra Terra - The Aquarius Era (1999) (BMG Classics 74321 697182)
- Part III: Amor Aeternus - Hymns of Love (2005), (Sony BMG 82876 66238 2)

The Chronicles detail a three part tale where some eccentric gods visit Earth, once in each album, to find some entertainment by watching the humans. They become fascinated by their actions and reaction, and begin to imitate them in order to understand them and their emotions.

The first part captures the western concept of a requiem while at the same time abandoning the traditional rich chords and free, rubato meter of a cathedral work. Instead, each of the voices has a soloistic line, accompanied not by sostenuto chords, but by a piercing trio from Le Mystère des Voix Bulgares, known in the Chronicles as "The Fireflies," and an unusual rhythmic accompaniment.

The lyrics of the first part "Flamma Flamma", all in Latin, were written by Herman Portocarero. The lyrics (in Latin) of the two other parts ("Terra Terra" and "Amor Aeternus") were written by Lens himself.

== Studio version ==
The studio-version (3 hours and 44 minutes released by Sony BMG 82876 66239 2) of this operatic work features vocalists such as (as credited) Derek Lee Ragin, Claron McFadden, La Verne Williams, Ian Honeyman, Jean-Paul Fauchechourt, Henk Lauwers and Marcello Rosca and the Bulgarian Voices Angelite.

== Live operatic version ==
In 2005 Lens recently rewrote an operatic acoustic version of The Accacha Chronicles of about 5 hours and 20 minutes which is very different -more complex in rhythm and tonality (much more a-tonal) than the CD-versions. This version was published in 2006 by Schott Music International (Mainz/New York City) but did not premiere yet.

== Nicholas Lens on The Accacha Chronicles ==
Lens has said that he intended The Accacha Chronicles to be a philosophical work, detailing a storyline along with its themes. "Accacha," Lens says in an interview, "is a mythical name, half-invented, half-existing. It stands for a reference book in which gods can find intimate details of all lives of human mortals. I used it because it is in a way reflecting what the main characters in this piece, the gods, are up to. And I like the sound of the word."

About the story: "A bunch of eccentric gods decide to visit earth, in total 3 times. Their visit has no special character, except maybe that they’re always in for some funny entertainment or distraction. And apparently the gods seem to be fascinated by the mortals and their behaviour, especially by their reactions on dramatic events like death, birth and love. So they imitate the mortals trying to literally feel what it is like to be confronted with typically human shortcomings or moods, with human sadness or joy, with human loss, death or birth. The natural wheel of life must obviously fascinate the gods, as everything which is limited in time becomes much more intensive, and they’re not used to those limitations. Isn’t it a fact that as death sneaks around every corner, it creates fear and angst, of course, but it feeds as well the necessary strength and the courage mortals need to make something of the time they have."

About the studio and the live version: "You could say that the CD –version is the light version of the actual extended work, with only melodic-tonal parts, call it the jeans version if you want, while the live-version is more a theatrical-dramatized concept, the orchestration –purely acoustic- is more complex in rhythm and tonality, there’s another sort of tension which needs more time to develop and to grow, so it is different as it is raising slower in its construction."

== Dedication ==
Nicholas Lens dedicated the entire trilogy to a certain lady Simona Noorenbergh from Fane, Papua New Guinea. Lady Simona Noorenbergh was a grandaunt of Nicholas Lens, living all her life in Papua New Guinea. She was one of the founders of the small mountain village called Fane deep in the Papuan jungle. Lens visited Fane twice. Once totally unexpectedly, the second time to bury her after she crashed with a Norman Islander-plane against the top of a mountain of the Papuan Central Province during a typhoon. Lens was very much shocked by this event. Shortly after this accident he started writing this trilogy.
