= L.I.T.A.N.I.E.S =

2020 chamber opera by Nicholas Lens

L.I.T.A.N.I.E.S is a 2020 chamber opera by Nicholas Lens set to an English-language libretto by Nick Cave. The work was published by Mute Song, and BMG publishing. A studio recording has been produced and released by Deutsche Grammophon

== Quotes by the writers ==
Nicholas Lens in Deutsche Grammophon insight: "The sense of peace took me back to a number of profoundly moving visits I had made to Yamanouchi, Kamakura – a verdant hillside neighbourhood in the Kanagawa Prefecture of Japan – site of the most ancient and highly treasured Rinzai Zen temples in the world. The initial idea for L.I.T.A.N.I.E.S was born in the natural silence that rises from the rainy and vivid green, moss forest that surrounds these 13th-century temples".

With L.I.T.A.N.I.E.S it is the second time that the artist Nick Cave writes the libretto for an opera by Nicholas Lens. Nick Cave: "Nicholas called me during lockdown and asked if I would write twelve litanies. I happily agreed. The first thing I did after I put down the phone was search 'What is a litany?' I learned that a litany was 'a series of religious petitions', and realised I had been writing litanies all my life." Cave further described the libretto as "twelve lyrical pieces that tracked the birth, blooming, fracturing and rebirth of a human being—petitions to a divine maker demanding some sort of cosmic acknowledgement and finding it beautifully rendered in the gorgeous music that Nicholas composed."

== Recording by Deutsche Grammophon ==
A CD and double vinyl recording was produced and released by Deutsche Grammophon. Nicholas Lens and Nick Cave are credited as artistic producers (musical directors) of the recording. Four vocalists are credited as interpreters: Clara-Lane Lens, Denzil Delaere, Claron McFadden, and Nicholas Lens Noorenbergh.

== Vocals and instrumentation ==
Four singers perform with an ensemble consisting of one flute and one alto flute, one clarinet and one bass clarinet, one alto and one tenor saxophone, one bassoon, one French horn, one trumpet, two percussions, harp, piano and strings.

== Lockdown recording ==
Due to the severe lockdown period during early spring 2020 with all the known restrictions, and the fact that all professional music studios were closed, most of the album was exceptionally recorded at Lens' home in the Dansaert center of Brussels. The album was finally mixed at Bleu Nuit Studios.

== Synopsis ==
1. Litany of Divine Absence
2. Litany of the First Encounter
3. Litany of Blooming
4. Litany of the Sleeping Dream
5. Litany of The Yearning
6. Litany of Fragmentation
7. Litany of the Forsaken
8. Litany of Gathering up
9. Litany of Transformation
10. Litany of Godly Love
11. Litany of The Unnamed
12. Litany of Divine Presence
