= Gil Morgenstern =

Gil Morgenstern is an American concert violinist, soloist, artistic director, and educator, also known for his interdisciplinary work through the Gil Morgenstern Reflections Series International concerts.

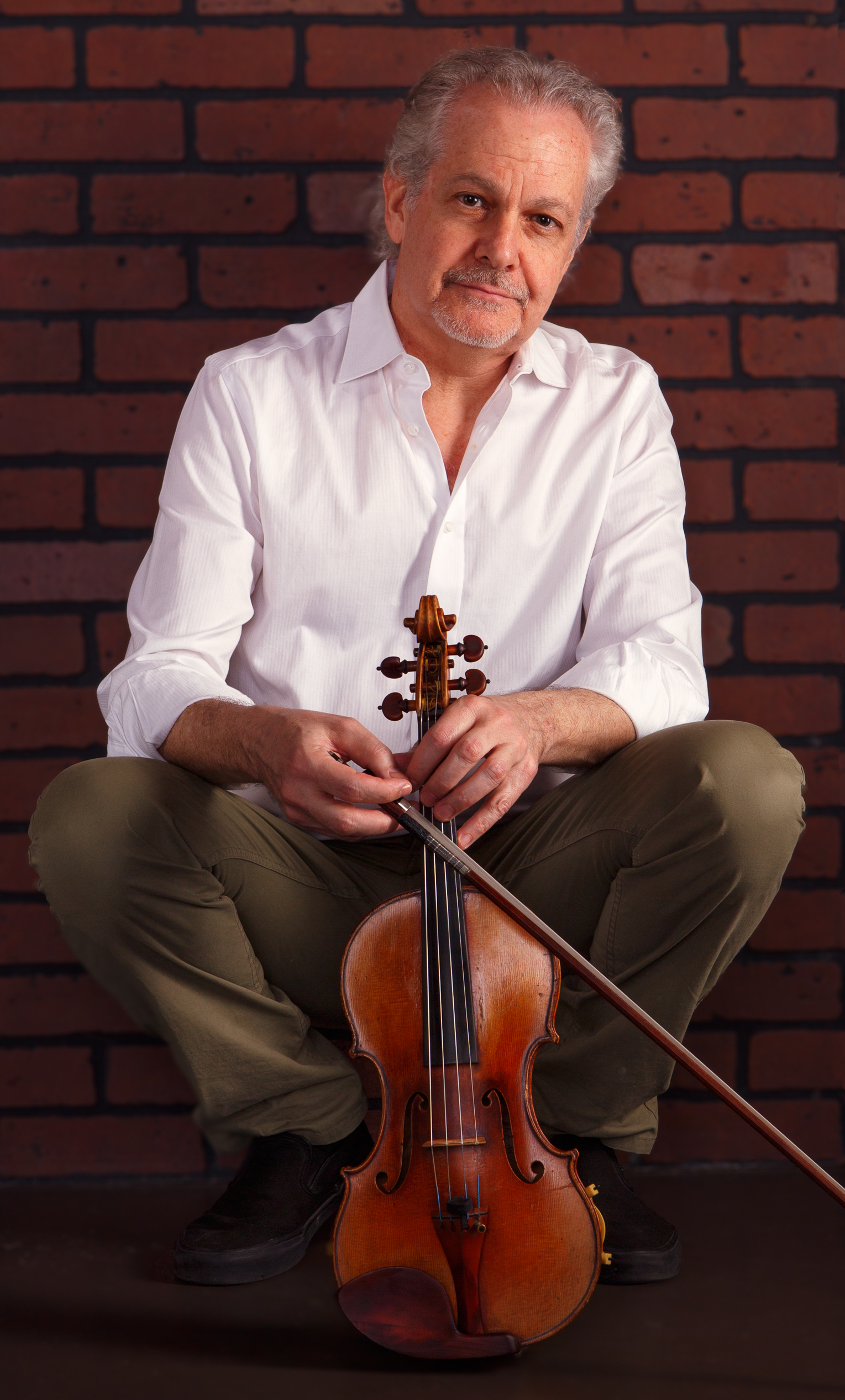
Gil Morgenstern, violinist. New York, NY

== Early life and musical training ==
Gil Morgenstern was born in New Brunswick, New Jersey and grew up in Edison. He began studying the violin at the age of five. He studied first with Daniel Schumann and later with Samuel Applebaum, and also performed regularly in public. Morgenstern became a pupil of Ivan Galamian at the age of 13 at the Juilliard pre-college division, entering the conservatory after graduating high school. In 1973, he won first prize for violin in the Washington International Competition. In the same year, he also won first prize in the National Society of Arts and Letters national competition. Gil Morgenstern performed at the White House in 1976 at a state dinner for King Juan Carlos I of Spain.

== Performance career ==
Morgenstern signed with Columbia Artists Management (CAMI) after graduating from Juilliard. He has performed internationally, including London, Hong Kong, Rome, Paris and Taiwan. Solo performances in the U.S. include St. Louis Symphony, Baltimore Symphony, Louisville Symphony, Indianapolis Symphony, Denver Symphony, Milwaukee Symphony, New Jersey Symphony and North Carolina Symphony. Morgenstern has also performed and collaborated with musicians including Lynn Harrell, Philippe Entremont, Andre-Michel Schub, Jeffrey Kahane, Sharon Isbin, Heinz Holliger, US Poet Laureate Robert Pinsky, Pulitzer Prize winner Yusef Komunyakaa, and performance artist Laurie Anderson. Morgenstern's discography includes works by Beethoven, Fauré, Aaron Copland, Ravel, Kodály, Sessions and George Tsontakis. He has recorded for Koch International Classics, MMC, and Engine Company labels.

== Artistic direction, interdisciplinary programming and pedagogue ==
In addition to his career as a violinist, Morgenstern has created interdisciplinary performances at Lincoln Center, 92nd Street Y and Harvard University. Morgenstern became artistic director of An Appalachian Summer Festival in Boone, North Carolina in the early 1990s. Under his direction, the festival provided a home for new works in development, including a staged version of Dante's Inferno with original music by Bruce Saylor, directed by Harvard professor Robert Scanlan using Robert Pinsky's translation. In 2006, Morgenstern stepped down as artistic director of An Appalachian Festival but has remained involved as an artist, performing on the chamber music series. Morgenstern and writer Jonathan Levi founded Nine Circles Chamber Theatre in 1999. Morgenstern is also the founder of Reflections Series International, a non-profit that presents interdisciplinary concerts of solo and chamber music juxtaposed with different artistic disciplines. Reflections had its inaugural concert in New York City in 2007 and has subsequently appeared across the U.S. and Europe. In 2014, Morgenstern was invited to be the inaugural Artist-in-Residence for Interdisciplinary Studies at Avenues: The World School in New York City.
