= Shell Shock (opera) =

2014 opera by Nicholas Lens

- Opera by Nicholas Lens
- Librettist: Nick Cave
- Language: English
- Premiere: 24 October 2014; La Monnaie, Brussels

Shell Shock is an opera by Nicholas Lens set to an English-language libretto by Nick Cave. The opera has been published by Mute Song, London and the world premiere recordings have been distributed by Universal Music Group.

The protagonists in this opera are besides the terrifying Angels of Death ("We drink breath") mostly the silent victims of war like the mother, the orphans, the unknown soldier, the colonial soldier, the fallen, the missing, the deserter, the survivor etc. The characters mutate into different characters and help each other in telling their individual story.

With Shell Shock it is the first time that the artist Nick Cave writes the libretto for an opera. The libretto has been described sometimes as highly explicit with in opera highly unusual text phrases like (in Canto of the Mother) 'Fuck God – Fuck the Flag'.'

== First performances ==
Shell Shock received its world premiere on 24 October 2014. The work was commissioned and first produced by the Royal Opera House La Monnaie in Brussels. La Monnaie Symphony Orchestra and Chorus, with Konzertmeister Saténik Khourdoian, was conducted by Koen Kessels. For the first stage interpretation of this opera, the stage director and choreographer Sidi Larbi Cherkaoui, with set design and video by Eugenio Szwarcer, did use contemporary dancers of his own company Eastman, sometimes forming a heroic statue, but in general absorbing, underlining and accompanying the vocal soloist characters in their role to focus on the traumatic effects war has on individuals.

== Live television broadcast, Arte ==
The live version of the world premiere (2014), as well the live performances of the reprise in Paris (2018) have been broadcast on the French-German Arte television.

== Live double CD recording, Universal ==
A live double CD recording is distributed by Universal Music Group, the covers shows the painting 'The Unknown Soldier' by Clara-Lane Lens.

== Paris Peace Conference, 2018 ==
More than 4 years after the world premiere during the §international Weekend of War and Peace, Paris on November 10 and 11, 2018 Orchestre Philharmonique de Radio France with the Choir of the Silesian Opera performed the full opera again at Cité de la Musique (Philharmonie de Paris), conducted by Bassem Akiki. With live television broadcasting on Arte and France Musique.

== Roles ==
Role	Voice type	Premiere cast, 24 October 2014 (conductor: Koen Kessels)	10 & 11 November 2018 (conductor: Bassem Akiki)
The Mother, The Angel of Death, The Wife	mezzo-soprano	Sara Fulgoni	Sara Fulgoni
The Colonial Soldier, The Survivor	bass/baritone	Mark S. Doss	Mark S. Doss
The Unknown Soldier, The Soldier, The Deserter	tenor	Ed Lyon	Sébastien Droy
The Missing, The Soldier, The Deserter	counter tenor	Gerald Thompson	Magid El-Bushra
The Nurse, The Angel of Death	coloratura soprano	Claron McFadden	Laurence Servaes
The Orphans, the Child-Soldiers, The Children	Boy soprano	Gabriel Kuti, Gabriel Crozier, Theo Lally	Aman de Silva, Freddie Jemison / Caspar Burman, Kamran Adjepong
The People, The Mass, The Soldiers, The Deserters, chorus

== Instrumentation ==
These singers perform with an orchestra consisting of 3 flutes (one doubling on piccolo, one doubling on alto flute and bass flute), two oboes (one English horn), 3 clarinets (one bass clarinet), three bassoons (one bass bassoon), two horns, three trumpets (one flugelhorn), three trombones (one bass trombone), one tuba, timpani, three percussions, harp, piano and strings. The work also requires a four-part chorus.

== Synopsis ==
- I. Canto of the Colonial Soldier: A un ritmo moderato marcia, reale cerimoniale / Anthem del soldato coloniale – Con solennità quasi religiosa / Con una tensione ansiosa quasi costante / Anthem del soldato coloniale – Con solennità quasi religiosa
- II. Canto of the Soldier: Rapidamente e ritmicamente – come una respirazione rapida / Marciale grazioso / Attacco di sorpresa! – come un turbine che passa / è di nuovo calmo
- III. Canto of the Nurse: Largo di tristezza e grande passione interiore
- IV. Canto of the Deserter: Minuetto macabro / Violenta marcia / Piu aggressivo / Molto violente e caotico /Al ritmo di una brutale marcia/ Movimento fragile / Movimento con passione incontrollabile / Movimento fragile
- V. Canto of the Survivor part 1: Largo movimento con passione manifesta
- VI. Canto of the Angels of Death: A un ritmo moderato marcia, reale cerimoniale
- VII. Canto of the Survivor part 2: Danza della tragedia / Largo movimento con passione manifesta
- VIII. Canto of the Fallen: Danza turbolenta e macabra / Lirico, con tristezza poetica / Con splendore regale
- IX. Canto of the Missing: Tempo comodo con una tensione latente / Meditativa, come se fosse stato intossicato dalla marijuana un pochino piu veloce (qualcosa dal nulla nulla)
- X. Canto of the Unknown Soldier: Senza misura (la durata e determinata dal Direttore d'Orchestra)/ Calmo, ma con una grande tensione latente / Piu grande / Con una falsa tranquillita con una grande tensione latente – Esaltate e grande
- XI. Canto of the Mother: Atmosfera narcotica/ Tranquillo e quieto, ma con tensione di fondo
- XII. Canto of the Orphans: Stato di trance / Un pochino più veloce (qualcosa dal nulla)
