= Paul Gerimon =

Belgian singer

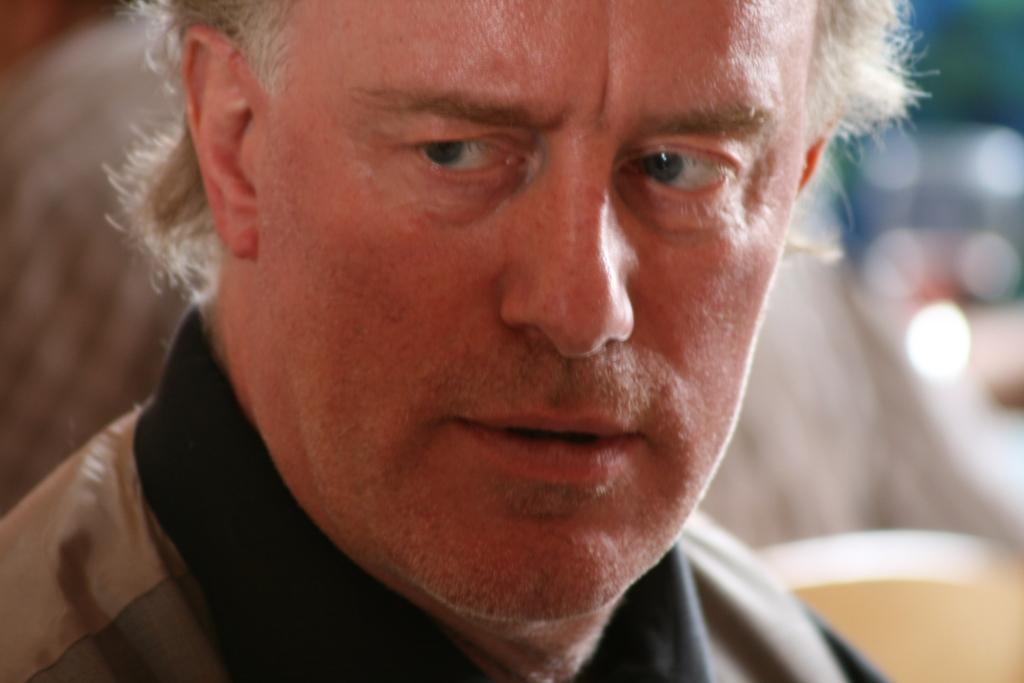
Paul Gerimon

Paul Gérimont, known as Paul Gerimon, is a Belgian bass who has an active international career performing in operas and concerts since the eighties.

== Biography ==
Paul Gerimon was born in Dinant (Belgium). Gifted with a deep bass voice, he already sings at the age of 17 years as a soloist at the Radio Télévision Belge Francophone and then as a bass soloist at the Théâtre Royal de La Monnaie where he sings during more than 30 years. He is also hired by the company of the Opéra Royal de Wallonie (Liège, 1983-1986). Since 1988, he is invited at the Festival d'Aix-en-Provence, the Théâtre des Champs Elysées, the Opéra-Comique in Paris, the Opéra du Rhin, the Philharmonie de Strasbourg, the Coliseu de Lisboa, the Teatro Massimo in Palermo, the Covent Garden – Barbican Centre in London, the Theater Carré in Amsterdam, the Nuremberg Opera, the Berliner Philharmonie, the Palacio de Bellas Artes in Buenos Aires, the Brooklyn Academy of Music in New-York...

He sings Caronte, Plutone (Pluto), Il Commendatore, Sarastro, Don Basilio, Sparafucile, Colline,... in Nabucco, Tannhäuser, Khovanshchina, Carmen, Tosca, Madame Butterfly, Die Frau ohne Schatten, The Phantom of the Opera. In Brussels he also performs at the Théâtre National in « Le Bourgeois Gentilhomme » and at the Théâtre de La Balsamine as Don Juan. He also collaborated with Eugène Ionesco, Fernando Arrabal and Michel Butor.

In concert he sings Monteverdi with Les Arts Florissants, the Concerto Vocale, Les Talens Lyriques, and also Bach's Magnificat, Les Sept Paroles du Christ en Croix of Haydn, Mozart's Requiem, the Damnation of Faust, Stravinsky's Renard,...

He works under the conducting of René Jacobs, William Christie, Christophe Rousset, Richard Egarr, Gianfranco Rivoli, Theodor Guschlbauer, Paul Daniel, Stefan Soltesz, Kazushi Ono, Antonio Pappano,... alongside Nelly Miricioiu, Viorica Cortez, Elena Zaremba, Alain Vanzo, Donald McIntyre, Franco Farina, Willard White, José van Dam, Simon Keenlyside,...

He performed at the Tercentenary of La Monnaie in front of king Albert II of Belgium and queen Paola and at the 4th Centenary of the Opera at Palazzo Pitti in Florence with the Maggio Musicale Fiorentino (Plutone in L'Euridice of Peri, Worldwide television broadcast).

From 2004 till 2010, he is administrator of l'Union des Artistes du Spectacle and URADEX (Related Rights) in Belgium. He is also administrator of Ars Lyrica.

In 2013 he sings Caronte (L'Orfeo) at the Barbican Hall (London) with the Academy of the Ancient Music and “The Father” in “Kafka Musical” in 2015.

Paul Gerimon is a singing teacher recognized by the Departement of Higher Artistic Education in the French Community of Belgium. He is a vocal coach for the Théâtre Royal de la Monnaie and for the Yehudi Menuhin Foundation between 2001 and 2008, and also in the Royal Academy of Music in Liège (2013-2014).

He has numerous recordings, videos and awards among which Maximilien Kolbe of Eugène Ionesco – Dominique Probst (Orphée d'Or of the Académie du Disque Lyrique), L'Euridice of Peri (Plutone, Maguelone CD), Wo Ma of Scelsi (Sub Rosa CD), Du Mont with Christophe Rousset (Emi CD - Virgin), Amor Aeternus of Nicholas Lens (Sony CD - BMG Classics), L'Orfeo of Monteverdi with René Jacobs (Caronte alongside the Orfeos of Laurence Dale and Simon Keenlyside, 2 CD's and 2 DVD's Harmonia Mundi, « Best Lyric Show of the Year », « World's Music Shock 2006 », « Caecilia Price 2006 »).
