= Terra Terra =

Terra Terra – The Aqurarius Era

Studio album 2nd part of The Accacha Chronicles by Nicholas Lens
- Released: 1999 and 2005
- Genre: Contemporary classical
- Length: 71:18
- Label: Sony BMG
- Producer: Nicholas Lens

Terra Terra – The Aquarius Era is a music drama by Nicholas Lens. It is the second part of the operatic trilogy The Accacha Chronicles, following the successful first part Flamma Flamma. In 12 sections, the score combines orchestra, chorus and six operatic voices that contrast with the eerie tonalities of two female nasal-natural singers.

== Cover, creations and adaptations ==
- The cover of Terra Terra shows a vague image of Lens' daughter Clara-Lane Lens as foetus.
- Terra Terra - The Aquarius Era premiered live on 30 October 1999 at the Musikhalle Hamburg in Germany.
- The newly published score of Terra Terra (rewritten by Lens in 2005 as second part of The Accacha Chronicles), did not premiere yet.
- A video film entitled Anima Superba (track 12 of Terra Terra) was directed by Isabelle Desprechins and produced by Tabaran Company.
- The film was shot around the Ganges river in India showing original footage of death and birth rituals.

== Credits ==
Second part of the operatic trilogy by Nicholas Lens The Accacha Chronicles

Music, Libretto and Concept: Nicholas Lens
Published by Schott Music International Mainz/ New York City
Studio version released by Sony BMG International (1999 and 2005) (BMG Classics 74321 697182 and Sony BMG 82876 66239 2)

== Track listing ==
1. Mors O Suavissima Rerum
2. Molitur Memoria
3. Milliens Millenae
4. Moritur Terra
5. Terra Aquarius
6. Eia! Eia! Fetus in Vulva
7. Mater
8. Pater
9. Pupulus
10. Infans Dolore
11. Pupulam O Puram
12. Anima Superba
13. Deus Meus
