= Herman Portocarero =

Belgian writer and diplomat

Herman J.P. Portocarero (born 6 January 1952, in Antwerp) is a Belgian writer and diplomat of Portuguese and Spanish ancestry.

== Diplomat ==
After graduating law school at Antwerp University, Portocarero practiced law at the Antwerp bar. He joined the Belgian diplomatic service in 1978. His first posting was with the Belgian permanent representation to UNESCO in Paris. In 1979 he joined the Embassy of Belgium in Addis Ababa, Ethiopia. His main activity was to monitor Ethiopian politics and ongoing civil wars as Cold War proxy phenomena. In order to do so he widely travelled the country under often dangerous circumstances. In late 1982 he moved to the Embassy in Kingston, Jamaica—the beginning of a long and intricate relationship with the Caribbean region.

In Kingston as of 1983 he became deeply involved in the negotiations around the United Nations Convention on the Law of the Sea, the first step in a long career as a UN-related diplomat. The UN work became a full-time mission as of September 1985, when he moved to New York. After a first tour of duty there, during a sabbatical period 1989–1990, Portocarero worked as an independent consultant for the NGO Médecins Sans Frontières in the Sudan and Nicaragua, including at the fronts of civil wars: in Darfur and the Bar-el Ghazal in the Sudan, and on the Sandinista-Contra frontlines in Nicaragua. He took up diplomatic work and UN work again in late 1990, including during Belgium's mandate in the Security Council (1991–1992) in the aftermath of the first Gulf war and during the Balkan wars. In the summer of 1992 he returned to New York full-time and became one of the most active lobbyists for the UN Convention for the ban on anti-personnel land mines. He has said that the passing of this treaty was one of the few satisfying results of all his work in the UN. After the failed UNAMIR mission in Rwanda, he was involved in the reform of UN peacekeeping operations. He addressed the Security Council on this issue in November 1994.

In 1995 he became ambassador of Belgium in Havana, Cuba, and till mid-1999 was very active in promoting people-to-people contacts between Europe and Cuba, especially in the field of higher education. He established close personal connections within Cuban society, while engaging the authorities and seeking common ground on sensitive political issues.

In 2000 he took up UN diplomacy again (2000–2003), and after an intermediary posting as consul general in Atlanta, Georgia, returned to Kingston, Jamaica, in 2004 as ambassador to the entire Anglophone Caribbean island region, as well as to Haiti and the Dominican Republic. His work was mostly economic in Jamaica, chiefly helping to rebuild a public transportation system and infrastructure in Kingston, and politico-military in Haiti, monitoring the UN peacekeeping and institution-building efforts. At the end of his ambassadorship in Kingston, in 2008, he became consul general in New York, where he was mostly active as a lobbyist and fundraiser, including for major Belgian arts events in New York and elsewhere in the U.S.

In 2012 he ended his career as a Belgian diplomat to join the newly created European External Action Service, the diplomatic arm of the European Union. Based on his earlier experiences in Cuba and the Caribbean, as well as on his record in multilateral (UN) diplomacy, he was named the EU's first full-fledged ambassador to Cuba in July 2012. Based in Havana, he oversees a diverse portfolio of activities in the political, trade and investment, and development cooperation fields. His previous experiences in the Caribbean also allow him to lobby for more cooperation within the region.

== The writer ==
Portocarero's debut, La Combine de Karachi—an ironic take on high-brow crime fiction—was published in France in 1978. His commercial debut followed in Dutch in 1984 with the novella Het Anagram van de Wereld, a conte philosophique set in an exotic brothel. It became an instant cult classic in its market. Other books, both fiction and nonfiction, followed at almost a yearly rate.

Portocarero's work was initially praised as an example of postmodernism and structuralism, but he gradually moved away from overly intellectual writing to reach a wider audience with straightforward storytelling and journalism.

His most successful work to date, Cubaanse Nachten (Cuban Nights, 2000), based on his experiences during the years 1995–1999 in Havana, is the best illustration of this new approach. The book combines a quasi-telenovela narrative about daily life in Cuba with short intervening chapters retracing Cuba's complex history and politics. Cuba also took center stage in his next book, Trance Atlantico (2001), an occult detective story based on an impressive African sculpture, setting in motion intrigues in a triangle between Havana, the Congo, and Brussels.

The next critical and commercial success came in 2006 with New Yorkse Nachten (New York Nights), a post-9/11 crime and corruption story. It won the Hercule Poirot Prize for best crime fiction.

In 2012, Portocarero published an extensive memoir on his life and his career as a Belgian diplomat, Diplomatie & Avontuur (Diplomacy & Adventure). It received high critical acclaim and was praised as a totally new approach to the tired genre of diplomatic memoirs, as it is a highly personal account based on experiences and insights, shying away from any name-dropping.

Portocarero wrote the Latin libretto for the requiem Flamma Flamma, by composer Nicholas Lens. A neoclassical work of monumental proportions, Flamma Flamma continues to be performed and broadcast worldwide since its 1993 premiere.

All of Portocarero's writings are closely linked with his professional and personal experiences. In his Diplomacy & Adventure memoir, he states that his writer's credo is based on Robert Louis Stevenson's, in the sense that you have to live first to have stories to tell.

== Bibliography ==
- La Combine de Karachi (novel, 1979)
- Het Anagram van de Wereld (novel, 1984)
- Door de Naamloze Vlakte. Een logboek (novel, 1985)
- De Voornamen van de Maan (novel, 1986)
- De Eeuw die Beiroet Heet (novel, 1987)
- Later dan de Nacht (novella, 1988)
- Nachtblauw (novel, 1991)
- De Goudzoeksters. Een fotoroman (novel, 1989)
- Grenzen Genezen (essay, 1990)
- Geo-graffiti (essay, 1992)
- Het Vuurkind (novel, 1993)
- Ignis Perennis (novella, 1995)
- Domino (novel, 1998)
- Cubaanse Nachten: Onmiddellijke memoires (novel, 2000)
- Trance Atlantico (roman, 2001)
- Tropische Trajecten (novel, 2002)
- Tijgers Teken (novel, 2002)
- Goud! (novel, 2004)
- New Yorkse Nachten (novel, 2006)
- Jamaicaanse Nachten (novel, 2007)
- Haitiaanse Nachten (novel, 2008)
- All Demons' Day (novel, 2008)
- Diplomatie & Avontuur (memoir, 2012)
- Collaboratie, Fortuin en Ondergang (nonfiction, 2015)
- Havana without Makeup (nonfiction, 2017)
- De diamantdiaspora (nonfiction, 2019)
