= Simona Noorenbergh =

- Born: 1907; Ypres, Belgium
- Died: 1990 (aged 82–83); Fane, Papua New Guinea
- Occupations: Nun, Social Worker, Founder of Fane at Papua New Guinea

Sister Simona Noorenbergh (1907–1990) was a Belgian-born social worker and community organizer. The Australian author Joan Benbow writes in her book A walkabout life (ISBN 9780646991399) that in Papua New Guinea she was also known under the name Marmee.

She was born in Ypres, Belgium in 1907. She was one of the founders of the small mountain village Fane in Central Province, Papua New Guinea, where she was known in Papua New Guinea as "Sister Simona". At the age of 84 she died in an airplane crash in the Papuan mountains on July 5, 1990.

== Award ==
In October 1989 she was made a Knight of the Order of Léopold II, for services to the people of Goilala and Papua New Guinea as a whole, awarded by Wilfried de Pauw, Belgian ambassador to Australia and Papua New Guinea.

== Quotes ==
- "Having one big nose might be better than having two little ones."
- "I'll never go back to Belgium. To do what? Is there still something to be done? Papua New Guinea is where I belong and were I'll die."
- "My people in the tribes would consider it an honour if I offered them my body to be eaten. Having a look at myself it would for sure be a long extended meal."

== Personal life ==
In 1923 at the age of 16 Simona Noorenbergh read a story in a French magazine on Papua New Guinea. She told her parents that she immediately wanted to leave home to live in that country. This was refused. When she became very sick and her parents feared for her life they promised her that, when she got better, she would be allowed to go to New Guinea. Soon she was cured.

As the only way to get to New Guinea was to be sent by a religious organisation, she studied to become a nun at the congregation Lady of The Sacred Heart at Stockel, Brussels. In 1928, after she finished her novitiate she took a train from Brussels to Marseille and then left on a 3-month packet trade ship to Port Moresby where she was dropped off. She arrived at the age of 21 in the Goilala mountains by horse on December 8, 1928.

She worked and lived successively in Popole, Ononghe, Bema, Kosige, Boroko, Boregaina, Waima, Inauia and Fane. During many years she was confronted with the dominant disease Yaws, with heavy never-ending tribe wars and with cannibalism. In an interview with Elizabeth Kogomoni-Sowei of the Post-Courier in 1989 she mentions smiling that she was asked several times "to voluntarily offer my body for celebration. It would be considered an honour", she continues, "to be entirely and literally consumed and eaten, as in certain tribes they believe that then my spirit would stay forever in their village."

She gained respect by learning several local languages and became a jack-of-all-trades: teacher, nurse, singer, welfare officer, designer of clothes, organiser of primitive hospitals and elementary schools and educational services, and co-founder of Fane (quote Simona Noorenbergh: "This is where I belong, this is where I'll die."), the mountain village in Central Province. Due to her respectable age, the local chiefs and people saw her as a guru and grandmother of all (the oldest age of Papuans at that time in Papua New Guinea was 50 to max 55 years) and they came by foot from far through the jungle to get her opinion on family issues and tribe problems.

At the age of 83 she went to Australia to have an eye-operation as she became practically blind. The operation succeeded but she crashed with an airplane when she got back to Fane in the Papua's. Due to a typhoon the Britten Norman Islander light aircraft hit a ridge-top in the Owen Stanley Ranges and slammed into a tree in the rugged terrain of Woitape in Central Province. Noorenbergh, sitting next to the pilot, was one of the 8 people who died, 4 survived. She is buried in Fane where she received a local funeral.

== Dedication ==
The operatic trilogy "The Accacha Chronicles", a secular, contemporary classical, music drama in Latin about Death, Birth and Love by Nicholas Lens, published by Schott Music Mainz/New York, has been entirely dedicated to Simona Noorenbergh by the author/composer.
