= Bruce Saylor =

American composer (born 1946)

Bruce Saylor (born April 24, 1946, Philadelphia, Pennsylvania) is an American composer.

== Biography ==
Saylor was born in the Germantown section of Philadelphia. In 1952, his family moved to Springfield Township, just outside the city, where he attended suburban public schools. Active as a musician in high school, he played, sang, and conducted. During this time, Saylor also functioned as the organist and choirmaster of a small Anglo-Catholic parish in the city. He attended the Juilliard School of Music from 1964 to 1969, where he studied composition with Hugo Weisgall and Roger Sessions. From 1969 to 1970, he studied with Goffredo Petrassi at the Accademia Nazionale di Santa Cecilia in Rome under a Fulbright fellowship. He received his PhD in 1978 from the City University of New York Graduate Center, where he studied composition with Weisgall and George Perle, and theory with Felix Salzer.

Saylor won numerous prizes and scholarships during his years at Juilliard as both a student and a teaching fellow there. In 1970, he began teaching at Queens College. From 1976 to 1979, he taught at New York University, then was appointed a Mellon Foundation professor at Queens. He has won fellowships and awards from the National Society of Arts and Letters, the American Academy of Arts and Letters (Charles E. Ives Scholarship and Music Award), the Ingram Merrill Foundation and the Guggenheim Foundation. As of 2012, he is a professor at the Aaron Copland School of Music at Queens as well as at the City University of New York Graduate Center in Manhattan.

== Works ==
Saylor’s musical idiom evolved from highly dissonant neo-classicism, though dense chromaticism, to a more streamlined harmonic language. Though he has written instrumental works such as Turns and Mordents for flute and orchestra, Notturno for piano and orchestra, Archangel for large orchestra, Cantilena for strings, and much chamber music, Saylor’s vocal music dominates his output. His two-act opera Orpheus Descending was premiered in 1994 at end of his stint as composer-in-residence at Lyric Opera of Chicago. J. D. McClatchy fashioned the libretto from the Tennessee Williams play. He has also written two one-act operas: My Kinsman, Major Molineux, after Nathaniel Hawthorne, and The Scrimshaw Violin, after the story of Jonathan Levi. The poetry of James Merrill has inspired Songs from Water Street, Five Old Favorites, incidental music for live readings of Voices From Sandover, and instrumental music as well. His vocal chamber music has most often been performed and recorded by his wife, the mezzo-soprano Constance Beavon, who created Saylor's monodrama It Had Wings, a story by Allan Gurganus. Saylor has written ten substantial pieces for chorus and orchestra, among them The Idea of Us and The Book in Your Hearts (both to texts by J. D. McClatchy), The Star Song (Robert Herrick), Dreams (slave narratives and spirituals), and Proud Music of the Storm (Walt Whitman and Emily Dickinson). He has written several elaborate scores for Nine Circles Chamber Theater, among them The Inferno of Dante and Falling Bodies. He has also been composer in residence at The Yard, an artists’ colony for dancers and choreographers on Martha's Vineyard.

Additionally, Saylor has composed numerous works for religious or ceremonial occasions in a tonal idiom: O Freedom! for President Bill Clinton’s Second Inaugural, Grand Central for the rededication of Grand Central Terminal, Fanfares and Echoes for the Bibliothèque Nationale de France, In Praise of Jerusalem (Psalm 122) for Pope John Paul II’s visit to New York City, two Christmas recordings for soprano Jessye Norman, and concert arrangements of sacred music by Duke Ellington for Norman’s Honor! festival for Carnegie Hall in 2009. Saylor has written dozens of anthems, hymn tunes, and service music for church and concert use.

== Discography ==
- Songs from Water Street
- Four Psalms
- See You in the Morning
- Quattro Passi
- Cantos from The Inferno
- Five Old Favorites
- Carillon Te Deum
- Jessye Norman "In The Spirit : Sacred Music for Christmas"
- Jessye Norman at Notre-Dame
