= Flamma Flamma =

Album by Nicholas Lens

Flamma Flamma – The Fire Requiem

Studio album 1st part of The Accacha Chronicles (European cover version) by Nicholas Lens
- Released: 1994, re-release 2002
- Genre: Contemporary classical
- Length: 75:24
- Label: Sony Classical - Sony BMG
- Producer: Nicholas Lens

Flamma Flamma – The Fire Requiem is a music drama by Nicholas Lens. It is the first part of the operatic trilogy The Accacha Chronicles. The work was artistically and financially produced by the composer himself and gained international fame when Sony Classical bought the rights in 1994 for worldwide distribution.

== Time magazine quote ==
According to Time magazine, Flamma Flamma is among those compositions of contemporary classic music "breaking down the established divisions between popular and so-called serious music" as "[w]ith its visceral strength and sustained emotional drive, Flamma Flamma has won a loyal audience and critical favor."

== Live performances and adaptations ==
- The American actor Frank Sheppard (picture) performed the part of the Gédé at the first creation of Flamma Flamma in a spooky abbey in Mechelen, Belgium in 1993.
- In 1998 Flamma Flamma was created with 2,000 participants for an audience of 30,000 people in Adelaide, Australia at the opening night of the Adelaide Festival of Arts at Elder Park (Festival intendant: Robin Archer).
- fLamma fLamma (1995) is the title of a short film based on the titletrack of Flamma Flamma by N. Lens, directed by Jan Bultheel, produced by Pix & Motion. The film was shown on MTV and Arte. It was the first time Sony Classical had a music track of one of his artists playing on the popular MTV-channel. Today, the video for "Flamma Flamma" still gets sporadic airplay on MTV European's late night eclectic show "Chill Out Zone".

The score has been used a numerous times for art-firework-performances and hundreds of dance and ballet creations all over the world. Lens, who considers himself (in interviews) more a fan of severe contemporary dance and moving theatre (Lens is Belgian born and has been influenced by the contemporary Flemish-Belgian dance scene), was not always happy with these adaptations. More than ten years after the original creation Nicholas Lens rewrote the score completely. This new, operatic and more extended and purely acoustic version, which seems far more complex in rhythm and tonality (read: a-tonality), -published in 2005 by Schott Music International (Mainz/New York) as first part of 'The Accacha Chronicles'- did not premiere yet.

Flamma Flamma -The Fire Requiem

Studio album 1st part of The Accacha Chronicles (American cover version) by Nicholas Lens
- Released: 1994
- Genre: Contemporary classical
- Length: 75:24
- Label: Sony Classical
- Producer: Nicholas Lens

In 1995 Sony Classical USA released an American cover version of the work. Sony Classical USA considered that the European cover, based on the labyrinth of Chartres (France), (originally a huge painting by the Japanese/Belgian artist Peter Bal) was too intellectual and arty for the American market. The American cover with the doubled androgynous angel face was designed by the New York artist Amy Guip. The change of cover was criticised in the American press.

== Track listing ==
1. Hic Iacet I (5:41)
2. Hic Iacet II (9:07)
3. Sumus Vicinae (4:57)
4. Tegite Specula (6:06)
5. Complorate Filiae (4:13)
6. Vale Frater (4:12)
7. Amice Mi (4:39)
8. Corpus Inimici (5:25)
9. Deliciae Meae (4:54)
10. Flamma Flamma (3:17)
11. Ave Ignis (4:42)
12. In Corpore (4:58)
13. Agnus Purus (5:55)
14. Ardeat Ignis (7:18)

== Credits ==
- First part of the operatic trilogy by Nicholas Lens The Accacha Chronicles
- Music & Concept: Nicholas Lens (also playing the keyboard)
- Libretto: Herman Portocarero
- Soprano: Claron McFaden
- Mezzo-soprano: Laverne Williams
- Counter: Gary Boyce
- Tenor: Zeger Vandersteene
- Baritone: Henk Lauwers (also playing the flute)
- Bass: Marcello Rosca
- Soloists of Bulgarian State Television Female Vocal Choir
- Belgian Radio and Television Choir (today Vlaams Radiokoor in Brussels)
- Published by Schott Music International Mainz/ New York City
- Released by Sony BMG International 74321 697172
- Original release by Sony Classical SK 66293
