= Clara-Lane Lens =

Belgian painter

- Born: Brussels, Belgium
- Known for: Painting

Clara-Lane Lens is a Belgian painter, so far particularly known for focussing on portraits of androgynous personas. At the age of 21, she had a first solo exhibition in Brussels (BE). Genderless, the theme of that expo stays the inspiration for most of her works upon today.

Astrid Verreycken in 254Forest: "Clara-Lane Lens paints using a classic imagery. Her works veers between the directness of a quick snapshot and an extensive study of the human body. All figures share something similar, beautiful but introvert. They are inward-looking, lost in thought. But there is also a kind of physical absence. She deliberately omits the characteristics that could reveal a character's gender. Spectators are regularly misled, yet precisely that's the attraction in her work. As you are left with the sense that something has eluded you."

Clara-Lane Lens currently lives and works at her atelier in Berlin (DE).

== Biography ==
Clara-Lane Lens was born in Brussels (BE). She did study at Luca, School of Arts, Ghent (BE). From 2019 on, immediately after obtaining her master's degree in the Arts, she moved to live and work in Berlin (DE).

== Cooperations ==
- In 2006 Clara-Lane Lens was introduced to the screen as a child actress (role The Whisper Kid) in the art film 'Love is the only master I'll serve,' world premiering at the Brooklyn Film Festival (BFF), New York
- In 2015 her painting The Unknown Soldier was used as front cover for the double CD Shell Shock (opera) by Nick Cave & Nicholas Lens, Universal Music Distribution published by Mute Records, London.
- Besides being mostly known as a painter, in 2020 Clara-Lane Lens performed as well as solo singer and speaker on all twelve tracks of the cd L.I.T.A.N.I.E.S, a recorded album of the trance-chamber opera written and produced by Nick Cave and Nicholas Lens. The CD was released and distributed by Deutsche Grammophon and published by Mute Records, London.

== Exhibitions and projects ==
- 2015 Visceral, Barcelona (ES), group
- 2018 Teerling, In de Ruimte, Ghent (BE), group
- 2018 SOLO EXHIBITION, Genderless, Le Lac, Brussels (BE)
- 2018 This thing in Aalst, Huis de Bolle, Aalst (BE), group
- 2018 Exhibition Fabrik, Leuven (BE), group
- 2019 Voor De Kat Zijn Viool, Nucleo Lindelei, Ghent (BE), group
- 2019 Braises de Satin -Maxence, publication CL-LL
- 2019 New Saints, Waldburger Wouters Gallery, Brussels (BE), group
- 2020 Experimental, Basement Berlin (DE), group
- 2020 These Selves, Pilar, Brussels (BE), group
- 2020 Watering plants, Spoiler Zone, Berlin (DE), group
- 2020 SOLO EXHIBITION, They never used to talk much, 254Forest, Brussels (BE)
- 2020 Community Exhibition Subbacultcha Magazine, De Studio, Antwerp (BE), group
- 2021 Grove Collective, London (EN), group
- 2021 Nationale 8 Gallery, Brussels (BE), Brussels GalleryWeekend duo
- 2021 SOLO EXHIBITION Moon in Vertigo, That's what x said, Brussels(BE)
- 2021 Infinite Discontinuity, SAO festival, Farrera (ES), group
- 2021 Have we met? Backhaus Project (Grove Collective), Berlin (DE), duo
- 2022 Friends of Ruby, Ruby Gallery, Brussels (BE), group
- 2022 SOLO EXHIBITION, Tell us we belong, Silvestri Galleria, Madrid (ES)
- 2023 SOLO EXHIBITION, Hiding between droplets of steam, JVDW, Düsseldorf (DE)
- 2024 SOLO EXHIBITION, It is cold in the cactus garden, Silvestri Galleria, Madrid (ES)

== Artistic Residencies ==
- 2020 Banditto Residency, Montepulciano (IT)
- 2021 Can Centre d'Art i Natura, Farrera (ES)
