= Irma Achten =

Dutch film maker and writer

Irma Achten (born 1956 in Haarlem, Netherlands) is a Dutch film maker and writer.

== Biography ==
Achten studied German and attended Drama School in Amsterdam. She received a 5-year award from the Nederlands Stimuleringsfonds for film in order to write scenarios. These resulted in several short movies, and three features she directed, were produced by Kasander Films.

Her films include Und Morgen wird die Sonne wieder scheinen, Canzonetta, Belle, and Marie Antoinette is niet dood (nominated for the Tiger Award and winner of the Audience Award at the Riga Film Festival) and Babs, starring the comedian Brigitte Kaandorp.

Achten's song "Was hast du mit meinem Herz getan" from the movie Marie Antoinette is niet dood, has become the cult outro for the German heavy metal band, Rammstein.

Achten also wrote the libretti for the operas God's Videotheek, and The Grief of Gravity, and scenarios for the opera films Samson et Dalila, Donna Giovanna and Rigoletto, and Buwalsky, a road opera, with a libretto by Jonathan Levi and music by Mel Marvin.

Her first novel Augustus was published in the Netherlands in 2019.
