= Brigitte Kaandorp =

Dutch comedian and singer-songwriter

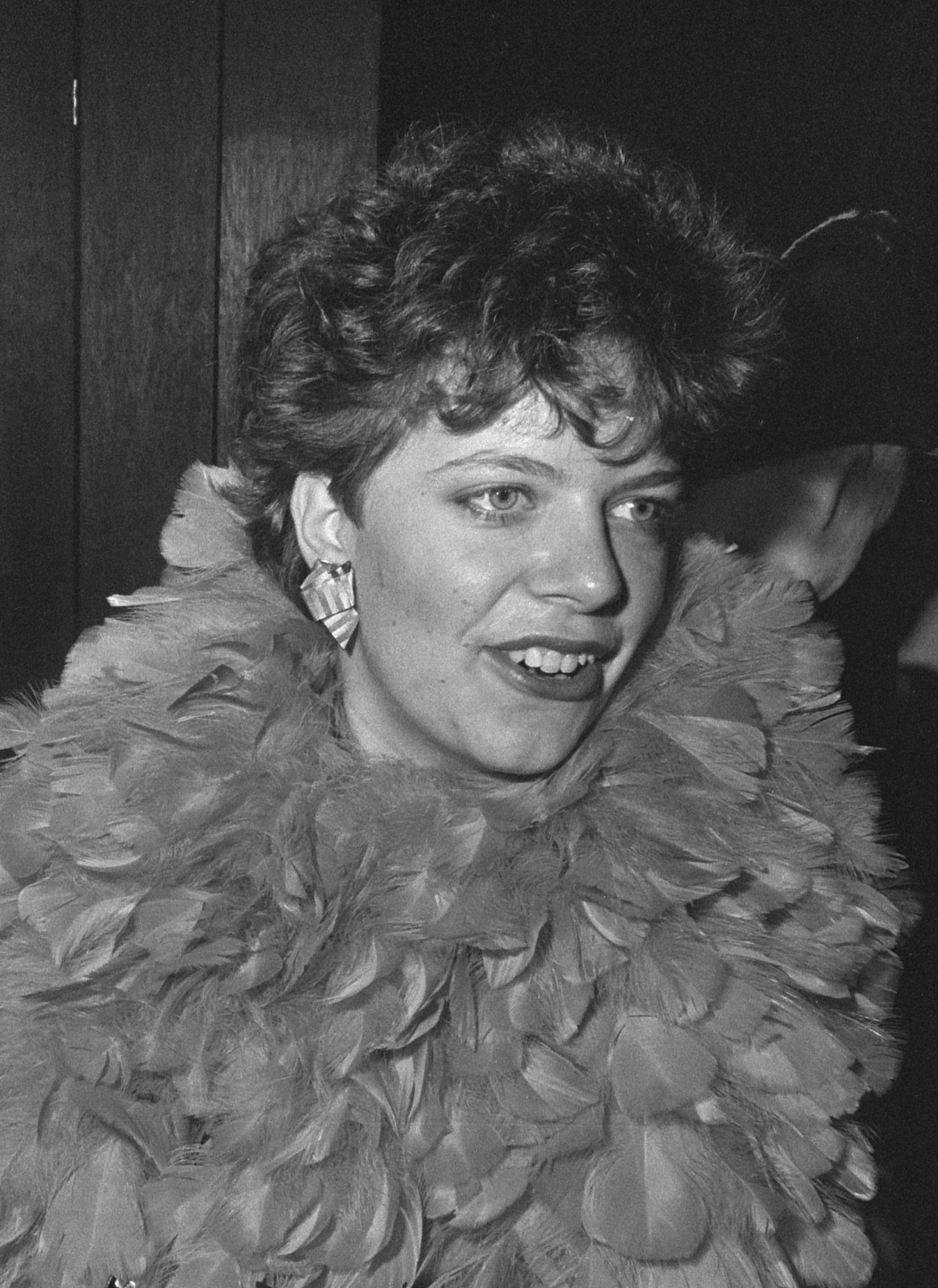
- Brigitte Kaandorp in 1987
- Born: Brigitte Allegonda Maria Kaandorp; 10 March 1962 (age 64); Haarlem, the Netherlands
- Known for: comedian, singer

Brigitte Kaandorp (born 10 March 1962 in Haarlem) is a Dutch comedian and singer-songwriter. She started her show business career in 1983. Kaandorp's style is a mix of absurdism and sensitive songs, sometimes playing the ukulele. Many of her shows have been broadcast on Dutch TV. She also performed in Belgium.

== Theater performances ==
- 1982: Brigitte Kaandorp 1
- 1987: Waar gaat zij helemaal alleen heen
- 1988: Laat mij maar even
- 1990: Kouwe drukte
- 1990: Brigitte Kaandorp 2
- 1992: Kunst
- 1995: Chez Marcanti Plaza
- 1997: ... En vliegwerk
- 1998: Miss Kaandorp, Brigitte de musical, CD opname
- 2000: Badwater
- 2003: Lustrum
- 2004-2006: 1000 & 1 dag
- 2007-2009: Zó
- 2011-2012: Cabaret voor beginners
- 2013: De Bonbonnière
- 2013: De Waddenzeetournee
- 2014-2015: Grande de Luxe (Extra Plus)
- 2016: Metropole volgens Kaandorp
- 2018: Wereldtournee
- 2018-2020: Eh...
- 2019: De week van Freek, with Freek de Jonge in Haarlem
- 2021-2022: Gedeelde smart, with Jenny Arean
- 2024: De Grote Adventshow, with nl:Patrick Stoof
