= Nicholas Lens =

Belgian composer of contemporary music (born 1957)

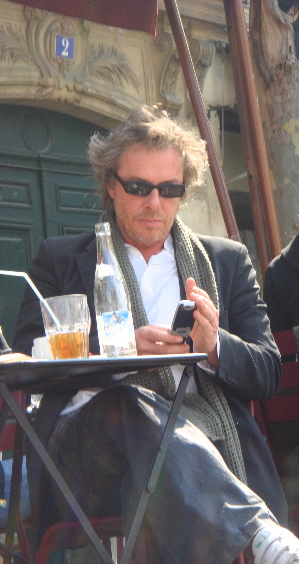
- Nicholas Lens in Paris in 2007
- Born: Nicholas Lens Noorenbergh; 1957 (age 68–69); Ypres, Belgium
- Occupations: Composer, librettist, author
- Website: www.nicholaslens.com

Nicholas Lens Noorenbergh (born 1957) is a Belgian composer of contemporary music, particularly known for his operas. His work is published by Schott Music and Mute Song and distributed by Universal Music Group and Sony BMG. In 2020 Lens signed with Deutsche Grammophon. He lives alternately in Brussels and Venice, and has one daughter, the Berlin-based painter Clara-Lane Lens

== Works ==
=== Operas ===
- Costello in limbo (Elizabeth Costello at the gate), opera, world premiere 2028 at La Monnaie with libretto by John M. Coetzee in a staging by Barbora Horáková Joly
- Is this the gate?, chamber opera with libretto by J. M. Coetzee, world premiere at Adelaide Festival, Australia 2024
- L.I.T.A.N.I.E.S, trance-minimal chamber opera with libretto by Nick Cave, written and produced by Nicholas Lens & Nick Cave, release by Deutsche Grammophon 2021
- Shell Shock, opera with libretto by Nick Cave, world premiere on 24 October 2014 at the Royal Theatre of La Monnaie
- Slow Man, opera with libretto by J. M. Coetzee based on his novel Slow Man, world premiere on 5 July 2012 at the Malta Festival, Grand Theatre, Poznań

=== Vocal and chamber music ===
- The Puppet Designer (Der Bashafer fun Marionetn) for baritone and chamber orchestra, live performance at UNESCO (The Power of Culture, Festival 18 June 1996), published by Schott Music 2006
- Wired, theatrical chamber music for harp and soprano, premiered at Beijing, China on 5 December 2006.
- The trilogy The Accacha Chronicles (2005), for soprano, tenor, countertenor, mezzo-soprano, baritone, bass, male actor, small choir, mixed choir and chamber orchestra, Sony BMG 82876 66239 2, published by Schott Music
  1. Flamma Flamma – The Fire Requiem (1994), Sony Classical SK 66293
  2. Terra Terra – The Aquarius Era (1999), BMG Classics 74321 697182
  3. Amor Aeternus – Hymns of Love (2005), Sony BMG 82876 66238 2
- Orrori dell'Amore (1995) for soprano, baritone, counter tenor and chamber orchestra, CD release on Sony Classical (SK 62016), published by Schott Music.

=== Study books ===
- 100 Etudes, Exercises and Simple Tonal Phrases for Piano (Volume I and volume II), published by Schott Music.
- Venticinque Movimenti per Contrabbasso solo (25 Movements for solo double bass), published by Schott Music.

=== Films and film scores ===
- The film (22 min.) Love Is the Only Master I'll Serve, premiered at the Brooklyn International Film Festival New York, June 2006, directing, script and music score
- The soundtrack of Mein erstes Wunder, a film by Anne Wild, world premiere at Berlin International Film Festival, 2003
- The soundtrack of ‘'Marie Antoinette is niet dood'’, a film by Irma Achten, world premiere at Rotterdam International Film Festival, 1996

=== Novel publication ===
Nicholas Lens is the author of the novel (Dutch language) called Het bed van lucht released by Borgerhoff & Lamberights.

== Artistic residencies ==
- Academia Belgica, Rome 1 September 2021 – 31 January 2022
- Geneva, Vandoeuvres, Fondation JAT - M.M., 6 residencies in 2023, 2024, 2025, 2026
- Chang Mai, artistic residency at Prem Tinsulanonda - patronized by Mom Luang Tridhosyuth Devakul -, 2023
- Villeneuve-lès-Avignon, artistic residency at La chartreuse, 2026
