= Claron McFadden =

American soprano (born 1961)

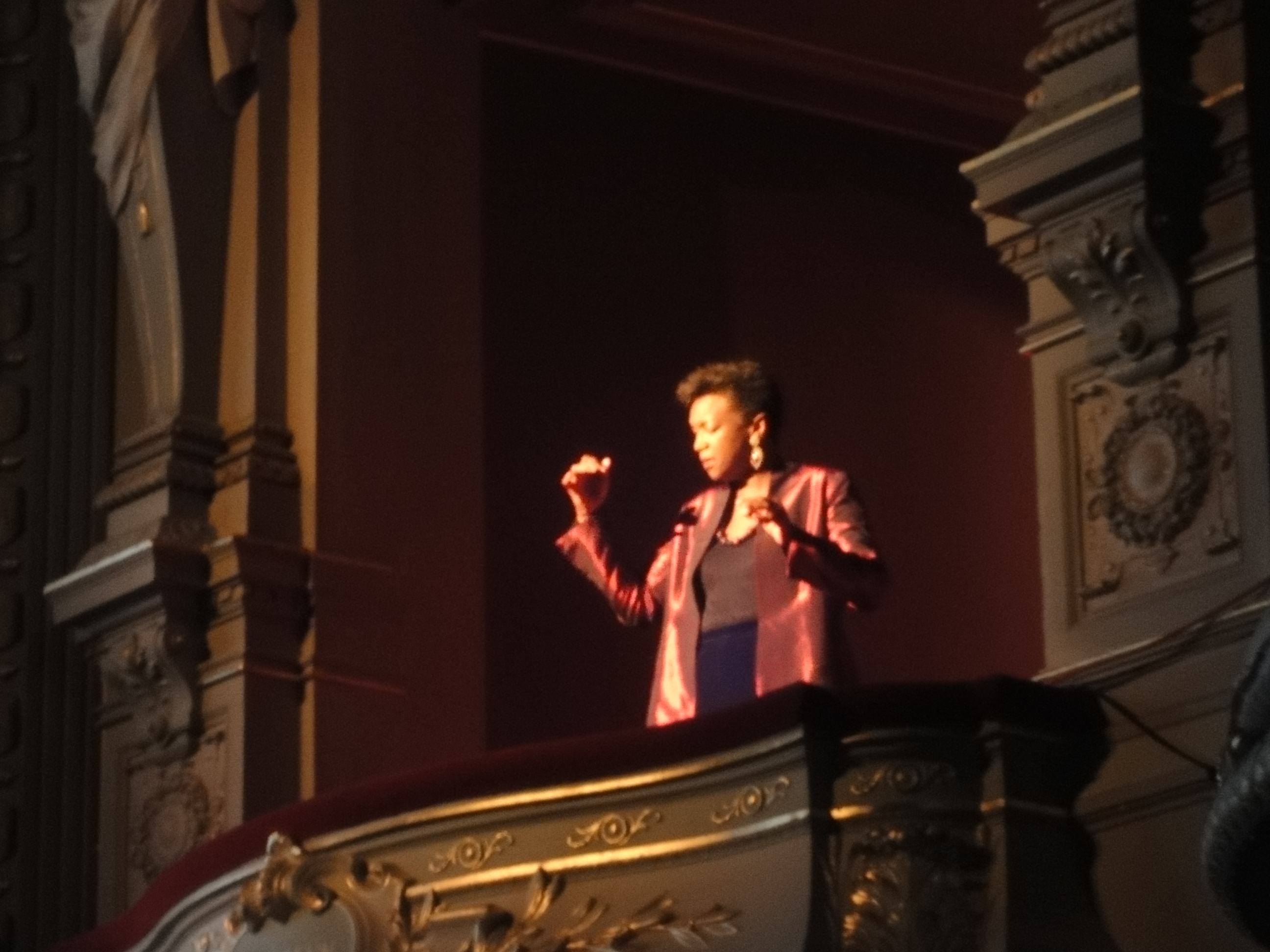
- Claron McFadden at TEDxAmsterdam, 2010

Background information
- Born: New York City, New York
- Genres: Opera; Contemporary classical music
- Occupation: Opera singer
- Instruments: soprano, coloratura

Claron McFadden (born 1961) is an American soprano. McFadden studied voice at the Eastman School of Music in Rochester, New York, finishing her degree in 1984.

She gained international fame when making her Glyndebourne Festival Opera debut in the title role of the opera Lulu, conducted by Sir Andrew Davis.

As well as singing many of the major oratorio works, McFadden became particularly world-famous for her interpretation of modern and contemporary music, such as in the album Flamma Flamma by Nicholas Lens.

McFadden is currently based in Amsterdam, the Netherlands.

== Opera performances ==
- Les Arts Florissants (William Christie)
- De Nederlandse Opera
- Salzburg Festival
- Opéra-Comique
- Bregenzer Festspiele
- Aix-en-Provence Festival
- La Monnaie (Brussels)
- Royal Opera
- Théâtre de la Croix Rousse and Théâtre de la Renaissance, Lyon

== Awards ==
On 23 August 2007 McFadden was awarded the Amsterdam Prize for the Arts (Amsterdam Funding for the Arts, The Netherlands) by Amsterdam Mayor Job Cohen.

== World creations ==
- The Woman Who Walked into Doors (2004), Kris Defoort
- VSPRS (2005), Alain Platel
- Orrori dell’Amore (1996), The Accacha Chronicles (2005), Love Is the Only Master I’ll Serve (2006), Nicholas Lens
- Inside Covers (3 tracks), The Home Made Orchestra (2004)
- The Letters of Calamity Jane to her Daughter Ben Johnston (2018)
- The Collected Works of Billy the Kid Gavin Bryars (2018)
- We Are the Lucky Ones, Philip Venables and Ted Huffman (2025)
