= Autobiographical novel =

Novel using autofiction techniques

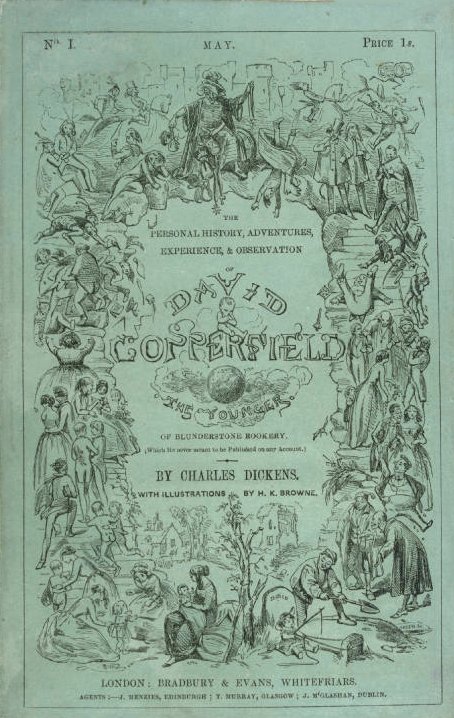
David Copperfield

An autobiographical novel, also known as an autobiographical fiction, fictional autobiography, or autobiographical fiction novel, is a type of novel which uses autofiction techniques, or the merging of autobiographical and fictive elements. The literary technique is distinguished from a typical autobiography or memoir by being a work of fiction presented in the same fashion as a typical non-fiction autobiography by "imitating the conventions of an autobiography".

Because an autobiographical novel is partially fiction, the author does not ask the reader to expect the text to fulfill the "autobiographical pact". Names and locations are often changed and events are recreated to make them more dramatic but the story still bears a close resemblance to that of the author's life. While the events of the author's life are recounted, there is no pretense of exact truth. Events may be exaggerated or altered for artistic or thematic purposes.

Fully autobiographical novels can be distinguished from semi-autobiographical novels or romans à clef. Sylvia Plath's The Bell Jar is often considered to be an example of a semi-autobiographical novel.

== Notable autobiographical novels ==
Author	Title	Year
James Agee	A Death in the Family	1957
Louisa May Alcott	Little Women	1868
Sherman Alexie	The Absolutely True Diary of a Part-Time Indian	2007
Maya Angelou	I Know Why the Caged Bird Sings	1969
James Baldwin	Go Tell It on the Mountain	1953
J. G. Ballard	Empire of the Sun	1984
John Barth	Once Upon a Time: A Floating Opera	1994
Saul Bellow	The Adventures of Augie March	1953
George Borrow	Lavengro: The Scholar, the Gypsy, the Priest	1851
Charlotte Brontë	Villette	1853
Rita Mae Brown	Rubyfruit Jungle	1973
Charles Bukowski	Post Office	1971
William S. Burroughs	Junkie	1953
Samuel Butler	The Way of All Flesh	1903
Louis Ferdinand Céline	Journey to the End of the Night	1932
J. M. Coetzee	Boyhood: Scenes from Provincial Life	1997
J. M. Coetzee	Youth: Scenes from Provincial Life II	2002
J. M. Coetzee	Summertime	2009
Charles Dickens	David Copperfield	1850
Charles Dickens	Great Expectations	1861
Nodar Dumbadze	Granny, Iliko, Illarion, and I	1960
Nodar Dumbadze	The Sunny Night	1967
Marguerite Duras	The Lover	1984
George Eliot	The Mill on the Floss	1860
Ralph Ellison	Invisible Man	1952
Annie Ernaux	Happening	2000
Annie Ernaux	The Years	2008
Frederick Exley	A Fan's Notes	1967
F. Scott Fitzgerald	This Side of Paradise	1920
James Frey	A Million Little Pieces (Note: A Million Little Pieces was marketed as a memoir before a media controversy questioned its accuracy)	2003
James Frey	My Friend Leonard (Note: My Friend Leonard was marketed as a memoir before a media controversy questioned its accuracy)	2005
Jean Genet	The Thief's Journal	1949
Jean Genet	Our Lady of the Flowers	1943
John Green	Looking for Alaska	2005
Graham Greene	The End of the Affair	1951
Ernest Hemingway	A Farewell to Arms	1929
Homer Hickam	Rocket Boys	1998
Thomas Hughes	Tom Brown's School Days	1857
James Joyce	A Portrait of the Artist as a Young Man	1916
Jack Kerouac	On the Road	1957
Jack Kerouac	The Dharma Bums	1958
Imre Kertész	Fatelessness	1975
Karl Ove Knausgård	My Struggle series	2009–2011
D. H. Lawrence	Sons and Lovers	1913
Tao Lin	Richard Yates	2010
Jack London	John Barleycorn	1913
Fitz Hugh Ludlow	The Hasheesh Eater	1857
Norman Maclean	A River Runs Through It and Other Stories	1976
Harry Martinson	Flowering Nettle	1934
W. Somerset Maugham	Of Human Bondage	1915
Henry Miller	Tropic of Cancer	1934
Henry Miller	Tropic of Capricorn	1939
Davis Miller	The Tao of Muhammad Ali	1996
Sandy Mitchell	Ciaphas Cain	2003
Tim O'Brien	The Things They Carried	1990
Kenzaburō Ōe	A Personal Matter	1964
Robert M. Pirsig	Zen and the Art of Motorcycle Maintenance	1973
Sylvia Plath	The Bell Jar	1963
Marcel Proust	In Search of Lost Time (Note: Also known as Remembrance of Things Past)	1927
Gregory David Roberts	Shantaram	2003
Mona Simpson	Anywhere but Here	1986
Gertrude Stein	The Autobiography of Alice B. Toklas	1933
Hunter S. Thompson	Fear and Loathing in Las Vegas	1971
Leo Tolstoy	Childhood	1852
Leo Tolstoy	Boyhood	1854
Leo Tolstoy	Youth	1856
Denton Welch	A Voice Through a Cloud	1950
Denton Welch	Maiden Voyage	1943
Elie Wiesel	Night (Note: Night is sometimes considered an autobiographical novel, although it is classified as a memoir by the author)	1958
Jeanette Winterson	Oranges Are Not the Only Fruit	1985
Thomas Wolfe	Of Time and the River	1935
Thomas Wolfe	Look Homeward, Angel	1929
Tobias Wolff	Old School (Note: Old School is loosely based on Wolff's life although it is more novel than biography)	2003

== See also ==
- Autofiction
- Autobiografiction
- Biography in literature
- Roman à clef
