= Arthur Sarkissian =

Armenian artist and painter

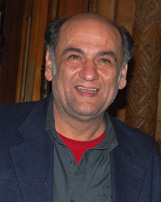
- Arthur Sarkissian in his solo exhibition, Los Angeles, CA 2010
- Born: 11 May 1960 (age 66)
- Education: Yerevan State Pedagogical University
- Known for: Painting
- Movement: Post-modernism
- Spouse: Irena Medavoy (m. 1981; div. 1984)

Arthur Sarkissian (Armenian: Արթուր Սարգսյան; b. 11 May 1960) is an Armenian artist and painter.

== Life ==
Sarkissian attended the School of Fine Arts in Yerevan in 1977, followed by the Yerevan State Pedagogical University (Drawing) in 1989. He lives and works in Yerevan, Armenia.

== Art ==
Sarkissian works in abstract art as a statement of post-Soviet freedom of expression. He said in 2005, "my approach to painting developed from the desire to free myself from Socialist Realism."

His canvases combine painting and silkscreen printing, incorporating text, photographs, signs, architectural images and extracts from other paintings, fusing oil paint with found ephemera.

Sarkissian’s art encompasses a diverse range of meanings and forms. His practice aligns with those of Robert Rauschenberg and Kurt Schwitters, and his work can be traced to predecessors such as Warhol, Cornell, Miro, Malevich, and Picasso. Sarkissian demonstrates that the “collage aesthetic,” characterized by simultaneously disjunctive and conjunctive qualities that define modern composition, possesses a significant and enduring legacy. This collage aesthetic serves as the perceptual crucible in which the aforementioned dialectic is forged and defines the particular visual world in which Sarkissian expresses himself.

His installation artwork includes the work Closed Session, comprising a row of seven chairs of varying sizes, each standing on four lit lightbulbs; described by Sonia Balassanian, curator of the Armenian Center for Contemporary Experimental Art (ACCEA), as a "satirical reference to self-aggrandizing decision-makers."

His work is displayed in the Museum of Modern Art in Yerevan.

== Works ==
Sarkissian's works include:

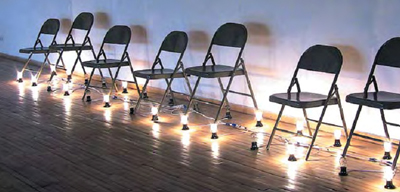
Closed Session (2007), mixed media installation

- Mind Games (2003), oil on canvas, 400 × 400 cm
- Game in the Museum (2005), mixed media on canvas, 195 × 145 inches
- Evening in the museum (2005), mixed media on canvas, 95 × 175 cm
- 20 Pages (2006), oil on canvas, 138 × 118 cm
- Three colour stains (2006), mixed media on canvas, 100 × 80 cm
- Closed Session (2007), mixed media installation
- Nervus Probandi (2009), oil on canvas, 120 × 195 cm
- Image Stripes (2011), oil on canvas, 110 × 140 cm. It was sold at the Christie's Auction in London.

== Exhibitions ==
Solo exhibitions:

- 1994 – Bossen Cultural Center, Saarbrücken, Germany
- 1998 – JNR Gallery, Yerevan, Armenia
- 2003 – Mind Games, First Floor Gallery, Yerevan, Armenia

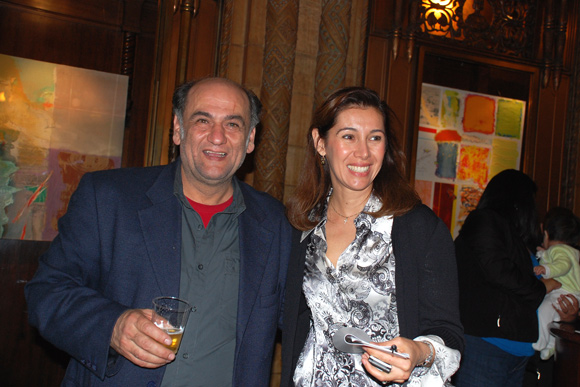
Arthur Sarkissian with his representative, Caroline Tufenkian, a 1927 Gallery, Fine Arts Building, Los Angeles, California

- 2006 – First Floor Gallery, Yerevan, Armenia
- 2008 – Museum of Modern Art, Yerevan, Armenia
- 2009 – Between The Images, One Gallery, Yerevan, Armenia
- 2010 – Between The Images 2, 1927 Gallery, Fine Arts Building, Los Angeles, California
- 2010 – Between The Images 3, Artology Gallery 101, Los Angeles, California
- 2013 – "Artist Retrospective 2011–2013 and Catalogue Presentation" Dalan Art Gallery, Yerevan, Armenia

Group exhibitions:

- 1989 – "Art of the USSR: The Past 50 Years", Madrid, Spain Catalogues
- 1991 – "New Tendencies in Art", Goyak Gallery, Yerevan, Armenia
- 1991 – "Contemporary Art From Armenia", The New Academy Gallery, London, UK
- 1992 – "Contemporary Armenian Artists", Gallery Vision, Kassel, Germany
- 1992 – "Armenian Post-Modernism", Moscow, Russia
- 1997 – "Dreams & Visions", Art Benefit, Chicago, Illinois, US
- 1999 – "Windows to Armenia" and "With Many Voices", Fourth Presbyterian Church, Chicago, Illinois, US
- 2005 – "Armenian Contemporary Art", Harvest Gallery, Glendale, California, US
- 2005 – Marie Pargas Art Gallery, Asheville, NC, US
- 2005 – The Collection Of Viken Makhyan, AGBU Pasadena Center, US
- 2005 – "Photo Plus", ACCEA, Yerevan, Armenia
- 2006 – "Art Without Borders", Havana Gallery, Oldenburg, Germany
- 2007 – "Armenian Landscapes in Contemporary Art", EWZ, Zurich, Switzerland
- 2007 – "5 Armenian Artists", Marcel, France
- 2007 – "Armenian Contemporary Art", Paris, France
- 2008 – "Undercurrent Shifts", ACCEA, curated by Sonia Balassanian and David Kareyan
- 2009 – "Transitional Hypothesis", group exhibition of Armenian-Japanese artists, ACCEA
- 2010 – "Colors of Armenia Exhibition" Yerevan, Armenia
- 2010 – "Colors of Armenia Exhibition" Marseille, France
- 2010 – "OPTIMIZM, Armenian New Art" Artists Union, Yerevan, Armenia
- 2011 – "Art Cube Gallery" Group Exhibition Laguna Beach, California, US
- 2011 – "Dalan Art Gallery" Group Exhibition Yerevan, Armenia
- 2013 – "Dalan Art Gallery" Group Exhibition New Local Art, Yerevan, Armenia
- 2013 – "Saatchi Gallery" Burning Bright at Hyatt Regency London – London, UK

== Gallery ==
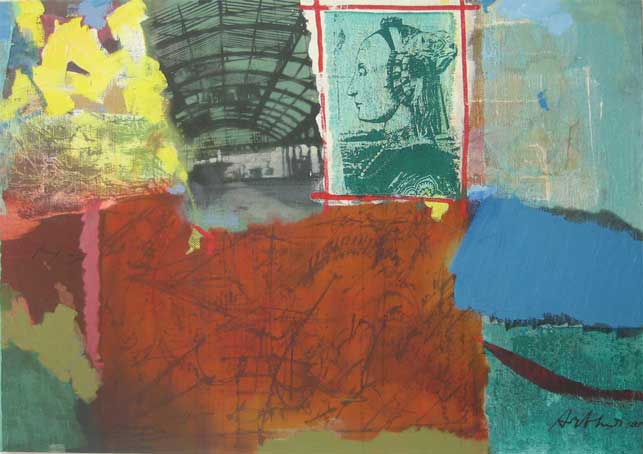
A Fabricated Page, 2006, oil on canvas, 70x90cm

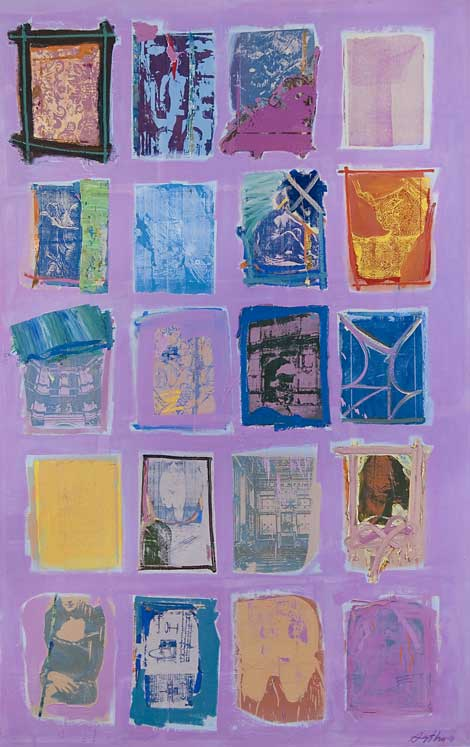
Twenty Color Pages, 2002, oil on canvas, 195x125cm.

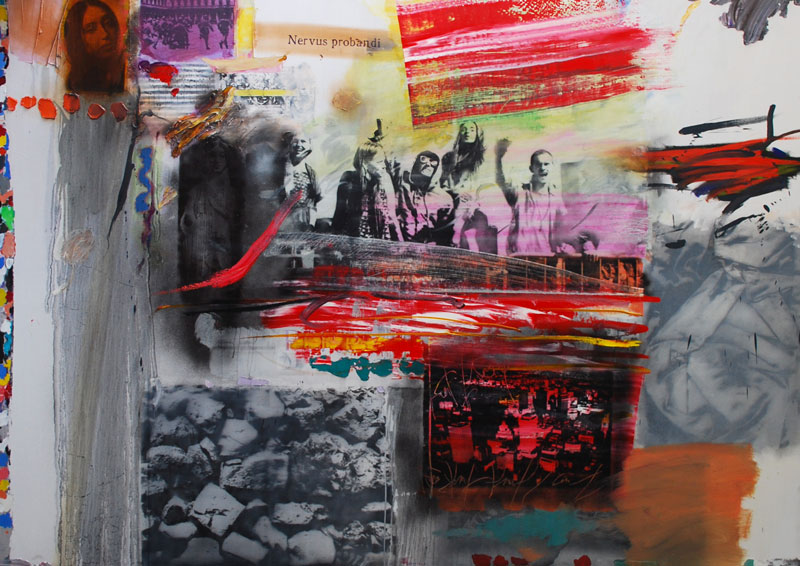
Nervus Probandus, 2009, oil on canvas,

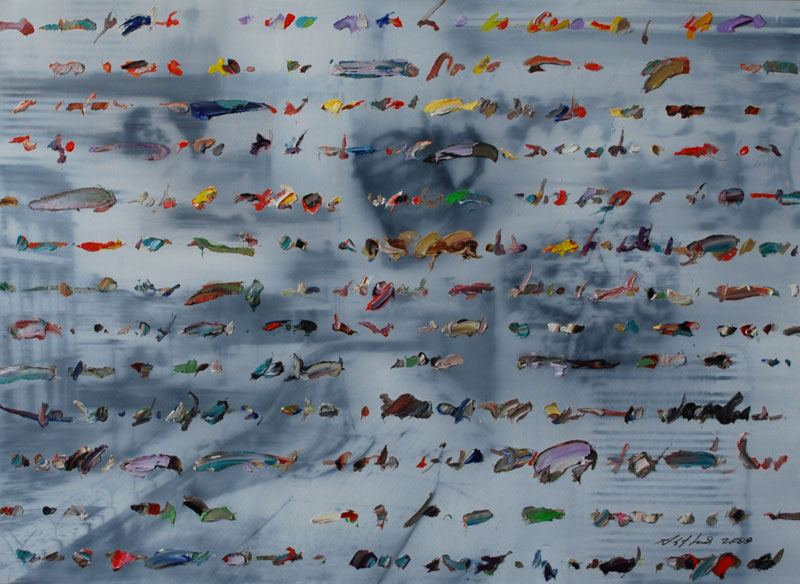
13 Colour Scriptums, 2009, oil on canvas, 80x110cm.

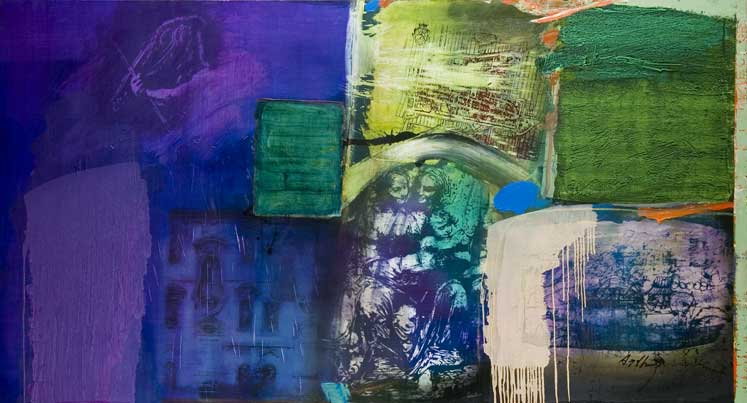
Evening in the Museum, 2005, oil on canvas, 95x175cm.
Sold at the Koller Auktionen Zürich

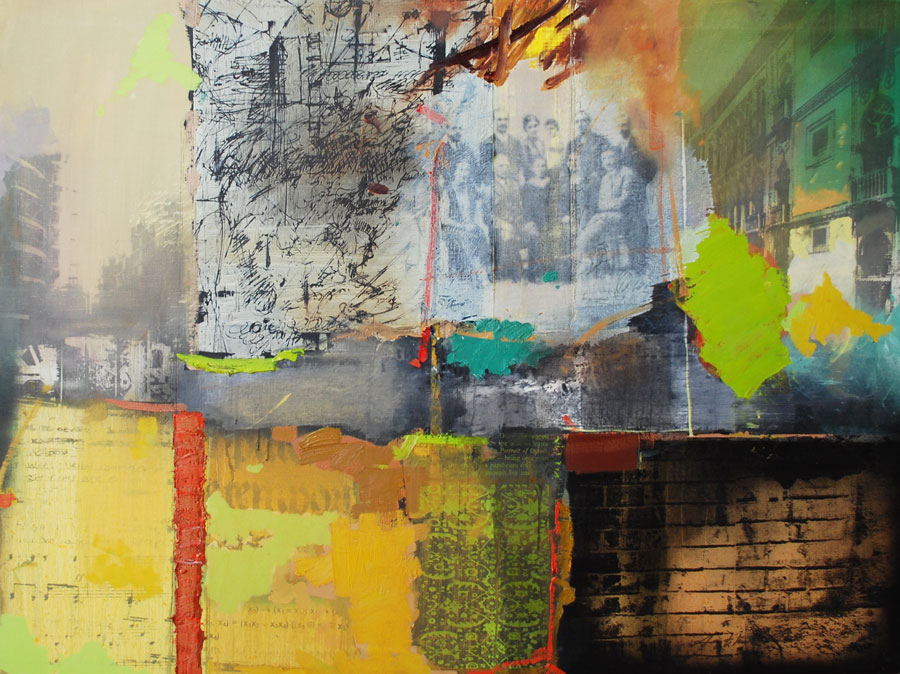
Cronicle, 2008, oil on canvas
