= Stepan Veranian =

Armenian artist

Stepan Veranian (Veranyan) Ստեփան Վերանյան
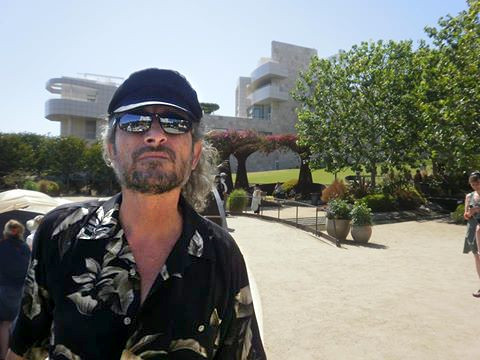
- Born: Stepan Veranian; 9 June 1955 (age 71); Yerevan, Armenia
- Known for: Painter, printmaker, stage designer, installation and photo artist

Stepan Veranian (Armenian: Ստեփան Վերանյան; born 6 September 1955, in Yerevan) is an Armenian postmodern artist.

== Life and career ==
Veranian was born in Yerevan to English teacher Beatrice Veranian and Hovhannes Veranyan, a conductor, who graduated from the Athens Conservatory and the Milan Conservatory. In 1946 his parents immigrated to Armenia from Greece. They were exiled to the Altai region of Siberia from 1949 to 1955. His brother, Artur Veranian, is a conductor.

From 1965 to 1970 Veranian studied at Yerevan's Martiros Saryan Art School. Works of his childhood are in the permanent exhibition at the Armenian Museum of Children's Art.

In 1979 he graduated in Industrial Design, Graphic Design and Painting from the Yerevan State Academy of Fine Arts. Later he destroyed all his paintings from this early period. In 1981 Veranian became a member of the Artists' Union of USSR.

Veranian married actress Nora Badalian in Yerevan on 29 November 1981; they have a daughter and son. From 1981 to 1991, Veranian was the head of the Graphics Department, National Center of Aesthetics of Armenia (NCA). In November 1981, he had his first show at the Artists' Union of Armenia and then at the Modern Art Museum, Yerevan (MAMY).

In 1991 his work Migration (tales of the Aegean Sea, sheet 02 and 03) was acquired by the Pushkin State Museum of Fine Arts, Moscow. Known in art circles, Veranian was largely unknown by the public until he appeared on Armenian TV in 1997, after the XLVII Venice Biennale International Exhibition of Art. In the Armenian Pavilion there Veranian exhibited his Untitled (model fresco) installation. In 1999 Veranian was the commissioner and curator of An Inter-Cultural Space project by the artist Narek Avetisian in the Armenian Pavilion at the XLVIII Venice Biennale International Exhibition of Art.

Veranian was the artistic director (1998 to 1999) of Printinfo and the artistic director (1999 to 2002) of the Armenian Center for Contemporary Experimental Art (ACCEA).

In 2002 Veranian and Badalian cofounded Yerevan Scope, a tourist handbook of Yerevan and Armenia.

== Work ==
=== Painting ===
Veranian's early abstract works include Garni (1983), Cilicia 01 (1984) and Cilicia 02 (1986). These works show the influence of Armenian ancient art. He exhibited Cilicia 02 in the Central Exhibition Hall Manege, Moscow, in 1986. Soviet art critic and art historian Aleksandr Kamensky wrote "Veranian is very talented. He has a wonderful sense of color, but this road leads to nowhere" in the Literaturnaya Gazeta (Literary Newspaper).

Veranian has focused on painting over the past few years, starting with the painting series Arrow of Apollo (2008–2011), Bactrian princesses (2008–2012), Moisture of Light (2012–2013), Uneatable fox (2012–2013), Arctic Ocean Library (2009–2014) and Orchestral Satan (2014), Alpine Sniper (2014), Ink-Eraser (2012–2013), Live to Tell (2012–2013) and Adventuress (2011–2014).

His Zenon archive (2008–2011) was shown at the Antikyan Gallery in 2011. The Windows of Mr.Arabian, Silk Mercers (2012–2014) are at the artist's studio. Veranian is regarded as one of the most important representatives of a generation of Armenian artists who distanced themselves from Abstract Expressionism. Art critic Alain Navarra-Navassartian wrote "If Stepan Veranian creates topography of the identity and interiority he does it by creating images of "places". The abstraction of its space is transformed into historical topography".

=== Installations ===
An exhibition of nine artists, "9" (1992), held at MAMY, served as the spring-board for several projects in the following years, leading to the creation of the Armenian Center for Contemporary Experimental Art (ACCEA). Veranian has created a number of installation art pieces including a glass balloon. With an expanded group of artists, an exhibition entitled Cuckoo Clacked (1992), and Identification (1993) were held at MAMY. Church (1994), devoted to the artist's grandfather Stepan Hovhannes, who was a priest in the Armenian Apostolic Church in Athens, consisted of dust, steam heating pipes and graffiti on the floor. This installation has been exhibited at MAMY. Corpus Hermeticum (1995) included green glass vintage wine jugs with hand print engravings inside, and graffiti on the floor. Zeazea Beazea, Sibyl, Metamorphoses (1996) was a collection of perfumery accessories and jars of cream, women's jewelry, jewelry boxes, combs, etc.- a drama of an aging beautiful woman. B2 Stealth Bomber, Buried Cities (1996) was a triangular shape on the concrete floor with a striped track. Later he displayed a smaller installation work, called Why Not, the Violet Silk Petticoats (1996) which consisted of а yarn for the knitting.

In October 1996, the Ministry of Culture and Monument Protection of Georgia invited Veranian to the inaugural exhibition of the International Art Biennale of Tbilisi.

Opus et setera (1998) consisted of the reconstructed model of a medieval merchant ship, traditional Lake Sevan sailing boats, and a bright neon installation drawing of the Wind Rose on the concrete floor. Executed town was exhibited in ewz, Zurich-Unterwerk Selnau, Kultur und Eventhaus (2007). Alain Navarra-Navassartian, art critic and curator of the exhibition wrote "By these objects strewn on terra cotta, creates a biography of places, the various accounts of the work acquire part of their mythical value and their historical relevance because they are anchored in concrete details, they have points of reference which one can see or visit. It is a question of orchestrating the power of imagination by locating it in a universal history but through imaginary topography. It is thanks to the reciprocal bonds between these common images that the social framework of our collective memory and formed."

The installation Space Shuttle, Donkey and Barbie Life was made from 2012 to 2014.

=== Paper works of art ===
Veranian, known primarily as a painter and installation artist, has also done printmaking. He considers his drawings to be a very intimate means of expression. His favorite subjects are the female form, and the nude figure. The unique drawing technique, involved in making of the drawings, is perfectly suited to immediate expression, as is Veranian's aristocratic drawing style.

=== Printmaking ===
Since 1981 Stepan Veranian has made etchings, aquatints and linocuts. Veranian fully embraced linocuts, during the period spent working in the Graphics Department, National Center of Aesthetics of Armenia. The National Gallery of Armenia and MAMY have bought his prints. The thirteen Blue Prints of 1985 were made with linocut and painting. Veranian created a key series of 21 large scale linocuts in 1989, influenced by Federico García Lorca's poems. Other prints include the Composition and Dreams (1989) series, consisting of 13 linocuts. This series of linocuts was displayed for the first time in September 1990 at MAMY, as part of a group exhibition. The Migration (tales of the Aegean Sea, sheet 02 and 03, the Pushkin State Museum of Fine Arts, Moscow), a series of 21 etchings, was created between 1989 and 1991. In May 1995, he created a number of etchings, inspired by his public and private life, for an exhibition called Moscow-Yerevan, Question of the Ark at MAMY.

=== Theater ===
Veranian has designed covers for novels. These include Zorair Chalapian's play Tteni (1987), ( "Թթենի", 1975), Georgian writer Nodar Dumbadze's play White Flags (1988), (თეთრი ბაირაღები; 1973), Croatian writer Ivo Brešan's play The Performance of Hamlet in the Village of Mrduša Donja (1989), (Predstava Hamleta u selu Mrduša Donja, 1971), William Shakespeare's play The Winter's Tale (1990) for State Dramatic Theater (Gavar). Veranian did stage design for the play Maria Stuart by Johann Christoph Friedrich von Schiller, performed at the THESPIS International Monodrama Festival, Kiel in 2014.

=== Photography ===
Veranian has produced many photographic works throughout his career, including Istanbul (1991), and Noravank (1995), and a book of 13 images Simple Photos – Rain Hatches (1996–2014) documenting a street installation Veranian made in Yerevan. The series Brood of Mockers (1999–2014) addresses questions of identity. Jugged Hare (2000–2014) shows Veranian's culinary fantasies and whims. Miss Anna of Silk (2010–2014) is a photo series created when Miss Anna came to visit from Moscow. Other photographic works include a series of thirty four images comprising the work Hotel Riu Palace Cabo San Lucas Photos – Living near the coast of Pacific Ocean (2012).

== Exhibitions ==
During the 1980s, Veranian exhibited in Moscow (1983) and Stockholm (1986). From 1991 to 2011, he participated in exhibitions at Paris (1990) and Saint Petersburg (1991), the Biennale of Tbilisi (1996), Boston, (1996), Venice Biennale (1997), Second International Biennial, Gyumri (2000), Tehran Museum of Contemporary Art (2002), Anixis Gallery, Baden (2005), and ewz, Zurich, Switzerland (2007). In 2011 another show was mounted by the Main Art Gallery of Santa Ana College in California.

== Permanent Collections ==
- The Pushkin State Museum of Fine Arts, Moscow, Russia
- National Gallery of Armenia, Yerevan, Armenia
- Yerevan Modern Art Museum, Yerevan, Armenia
- Tepper Takayama Fine Arts, Boston, Massachusetts, U.S.A
- Joan Aghajanian Quinn Collection, Los AngelesA
- Anixis Gallery, Baden, Switzerland

== Gallery ==
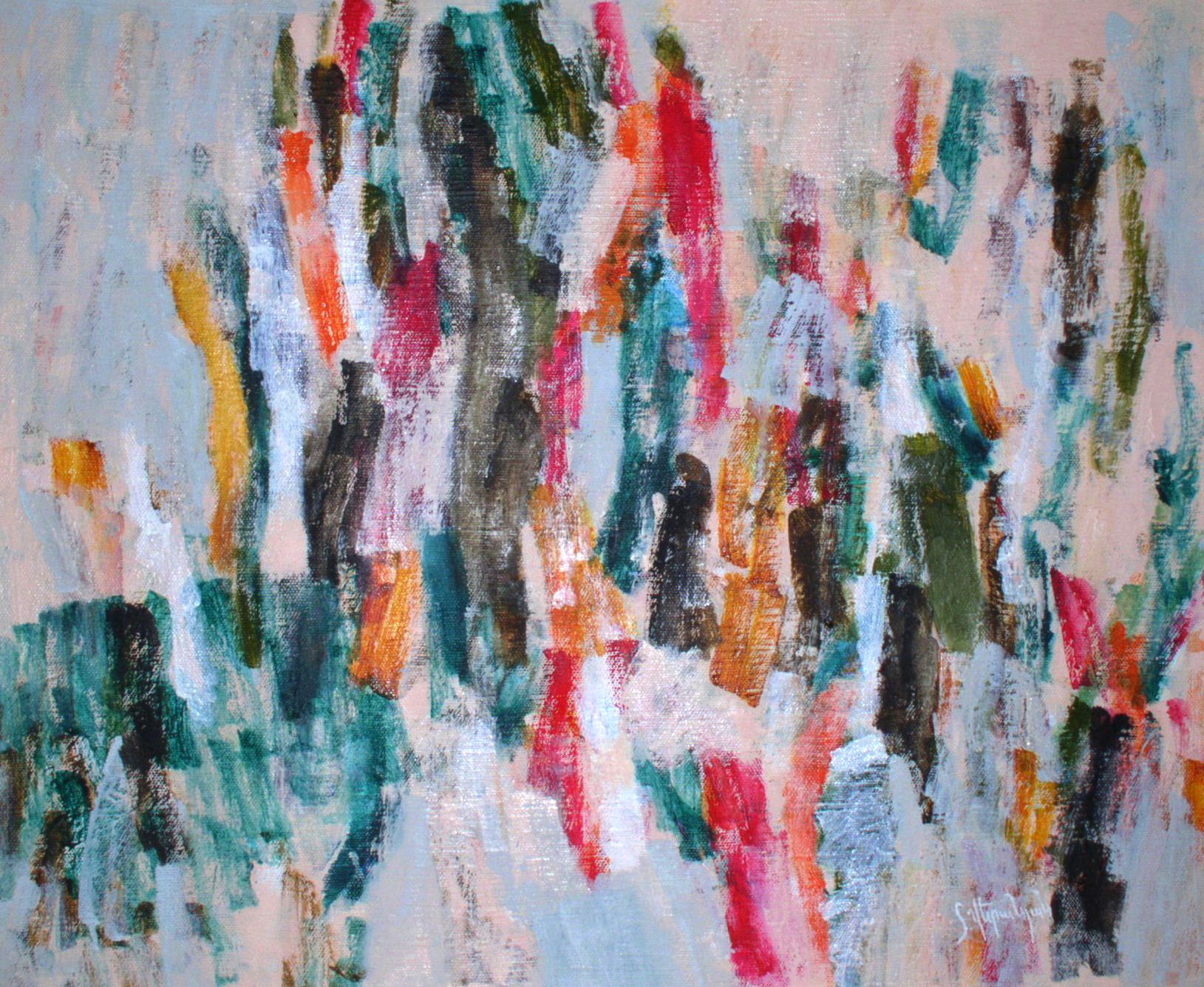

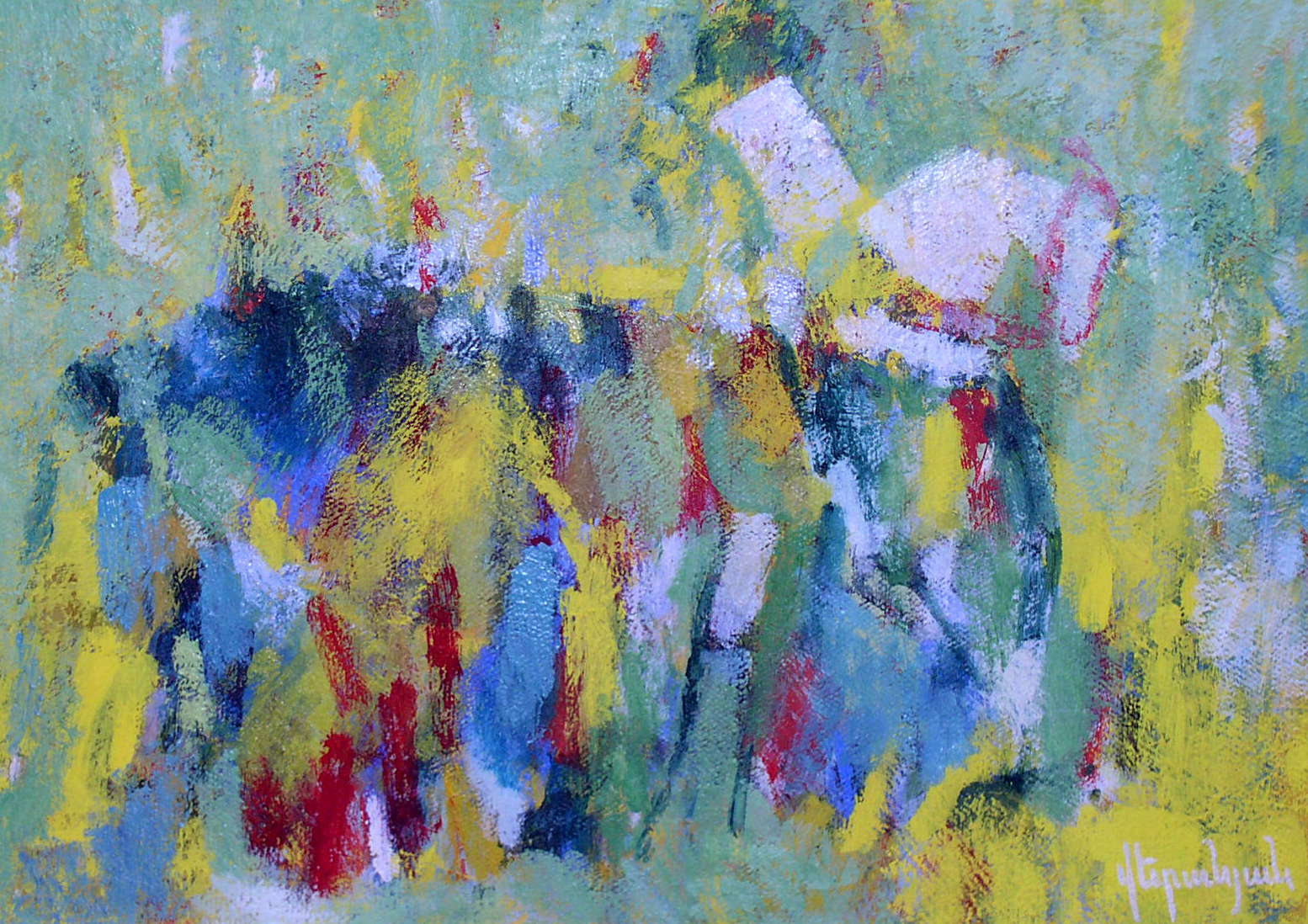

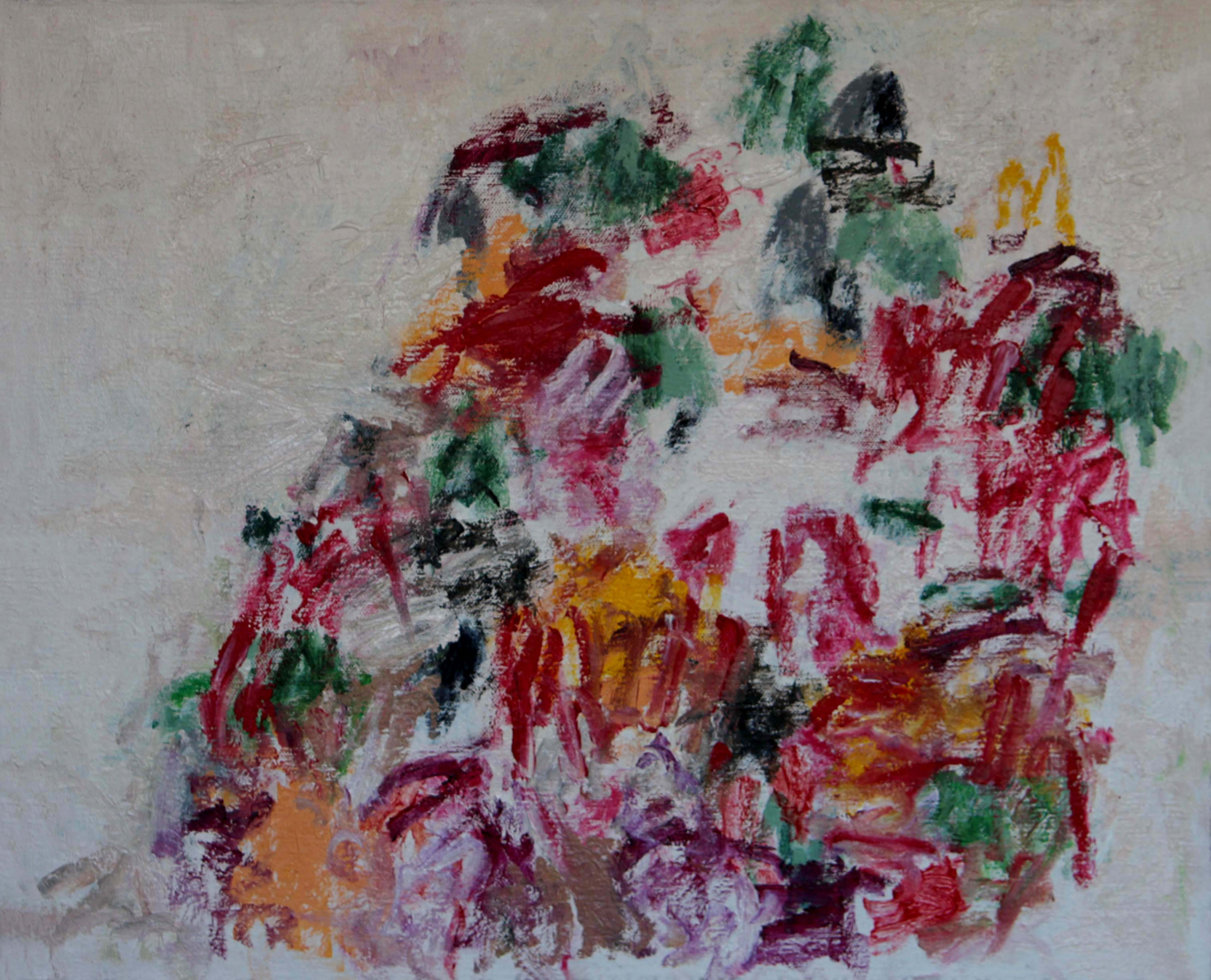

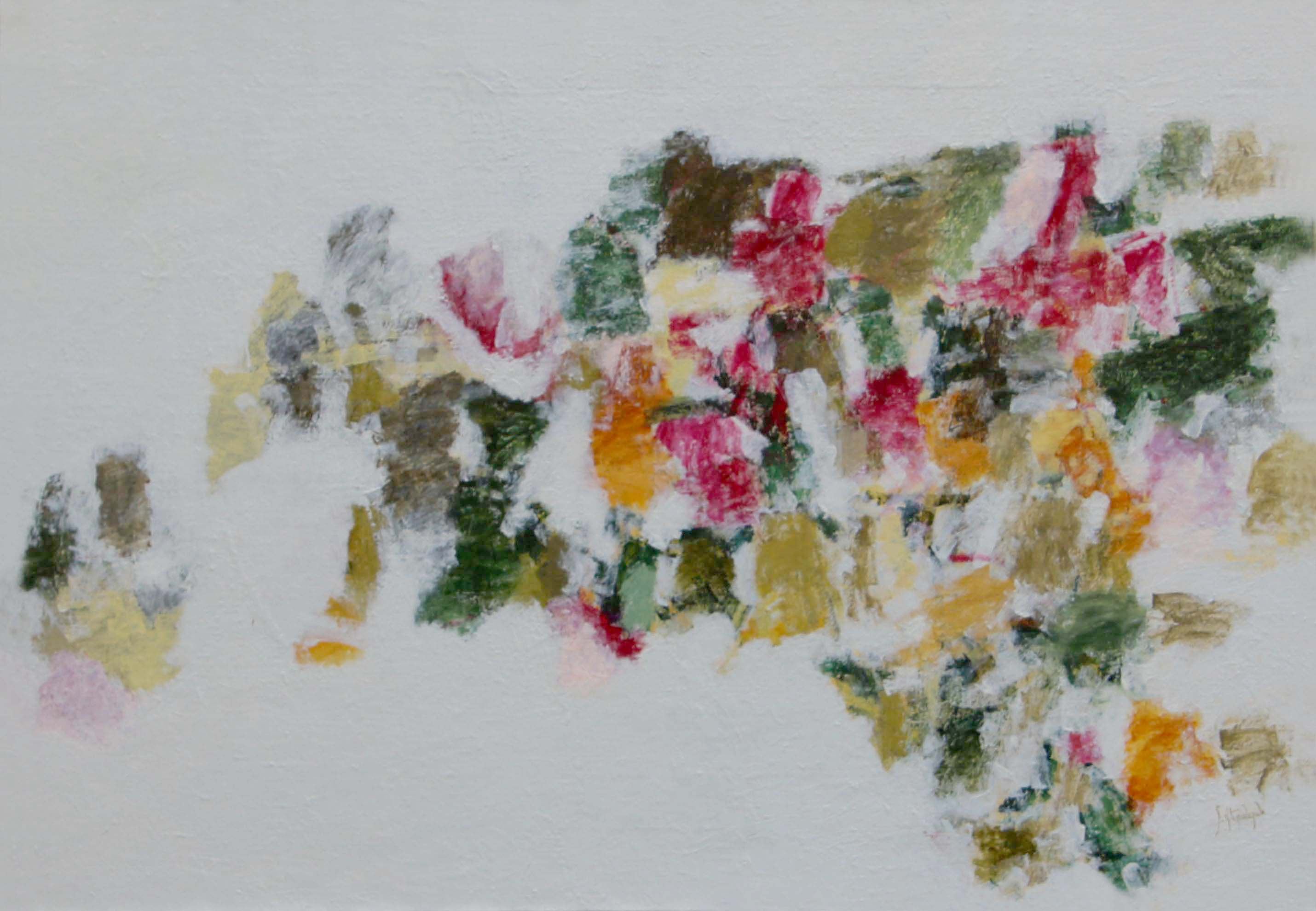

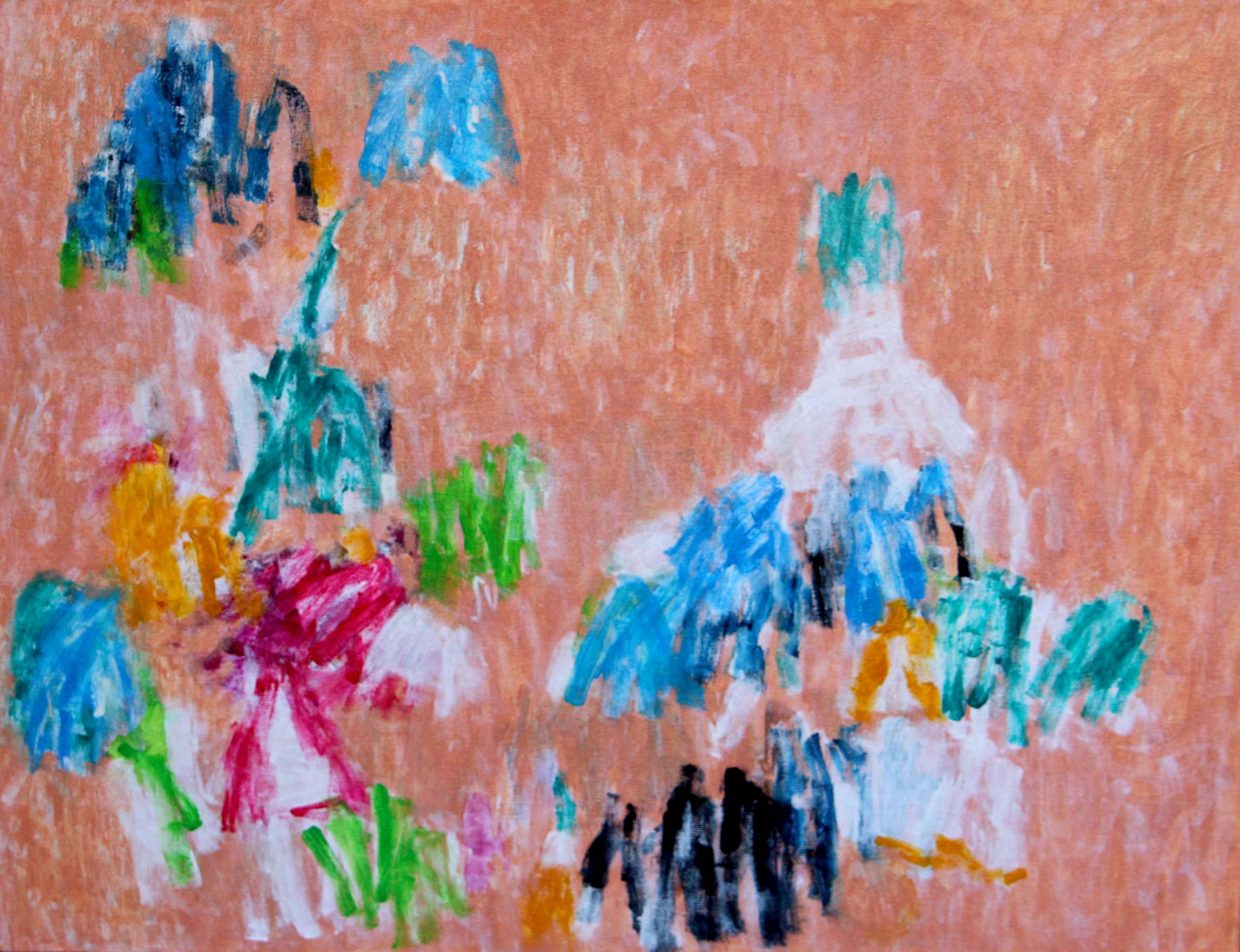

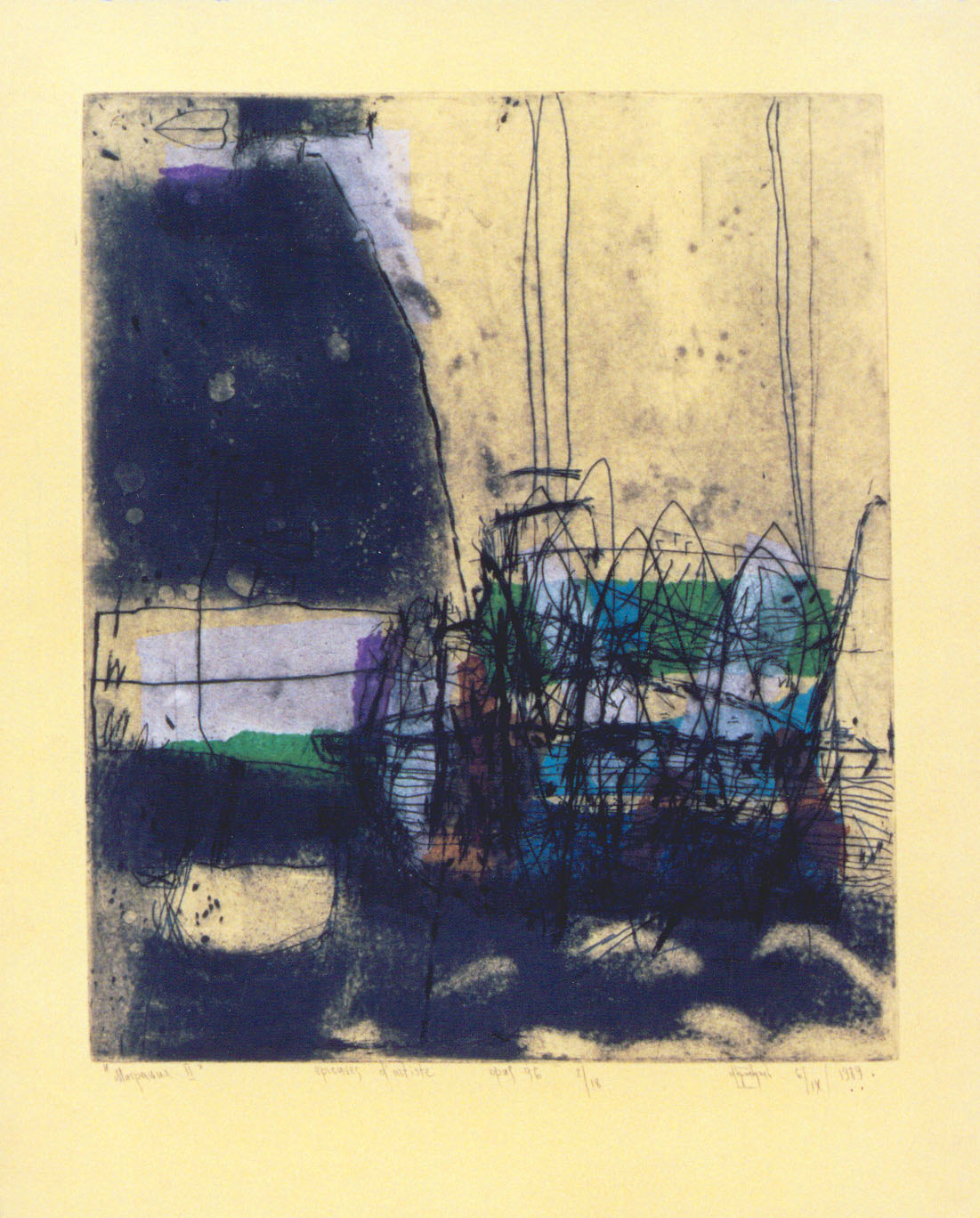

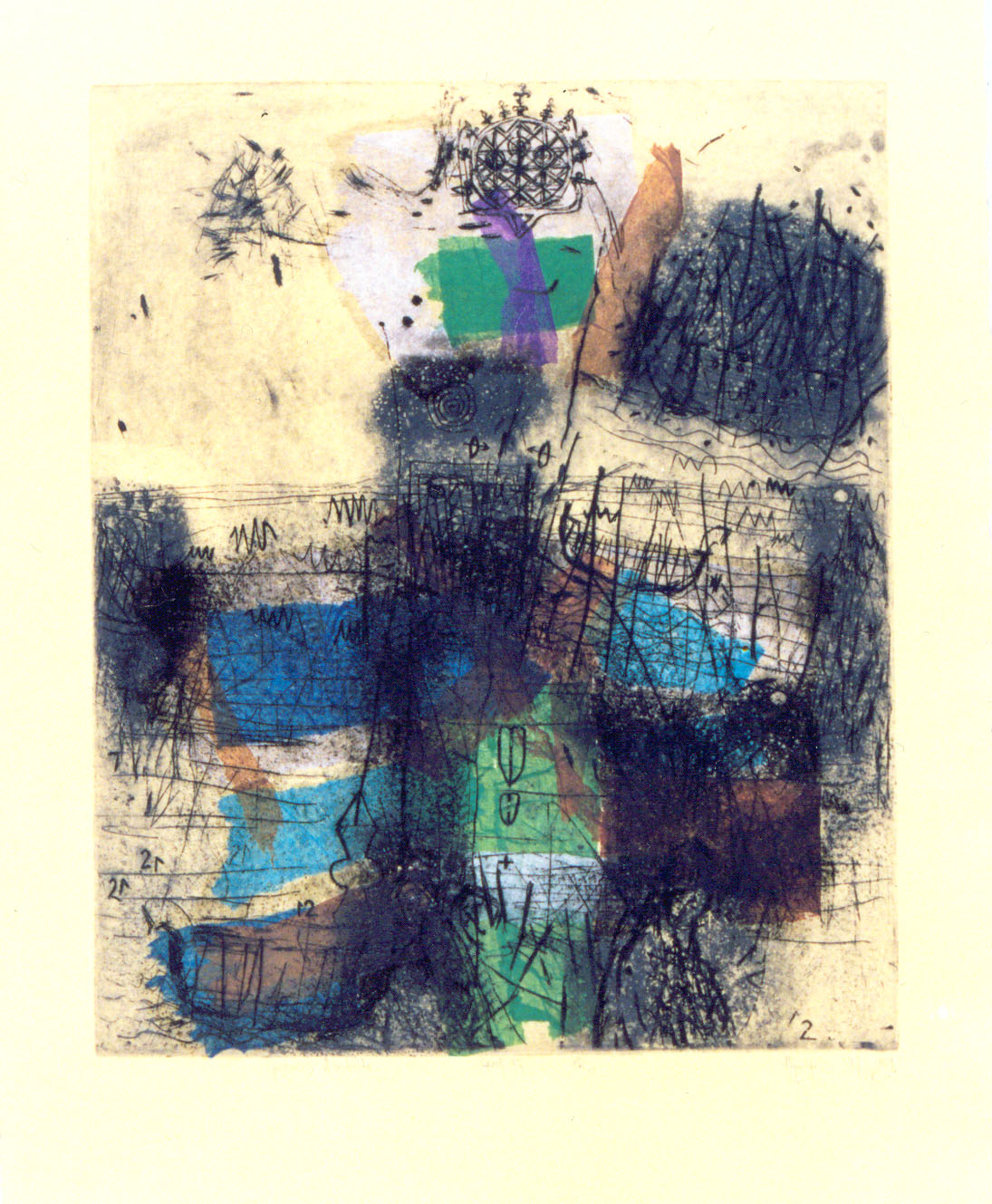

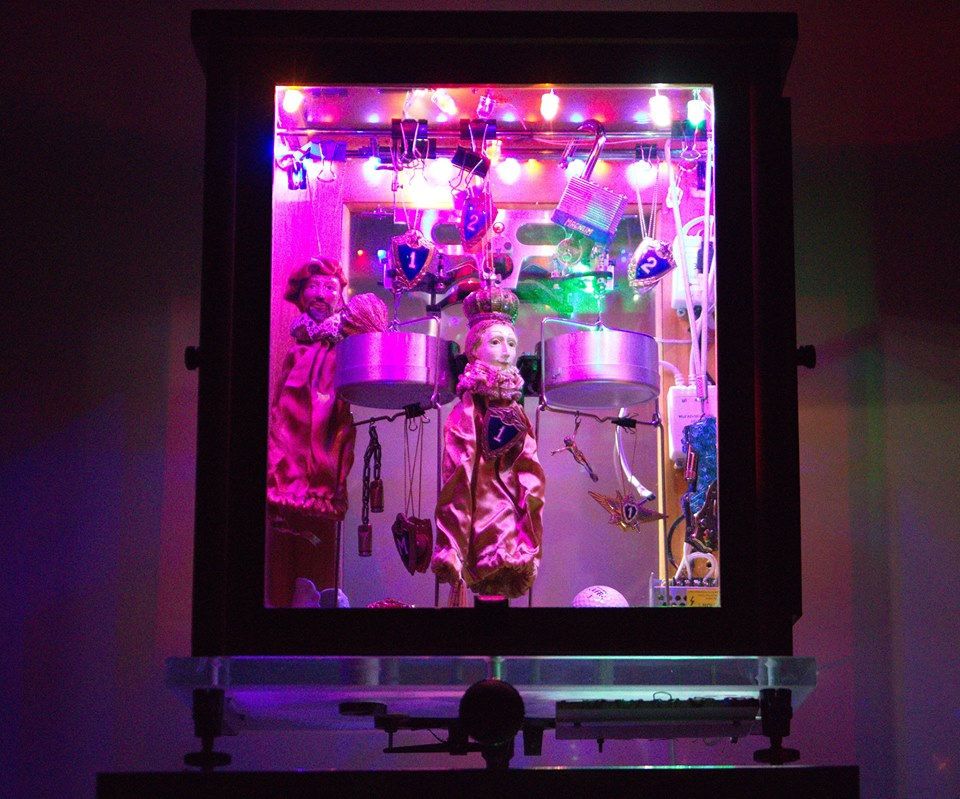

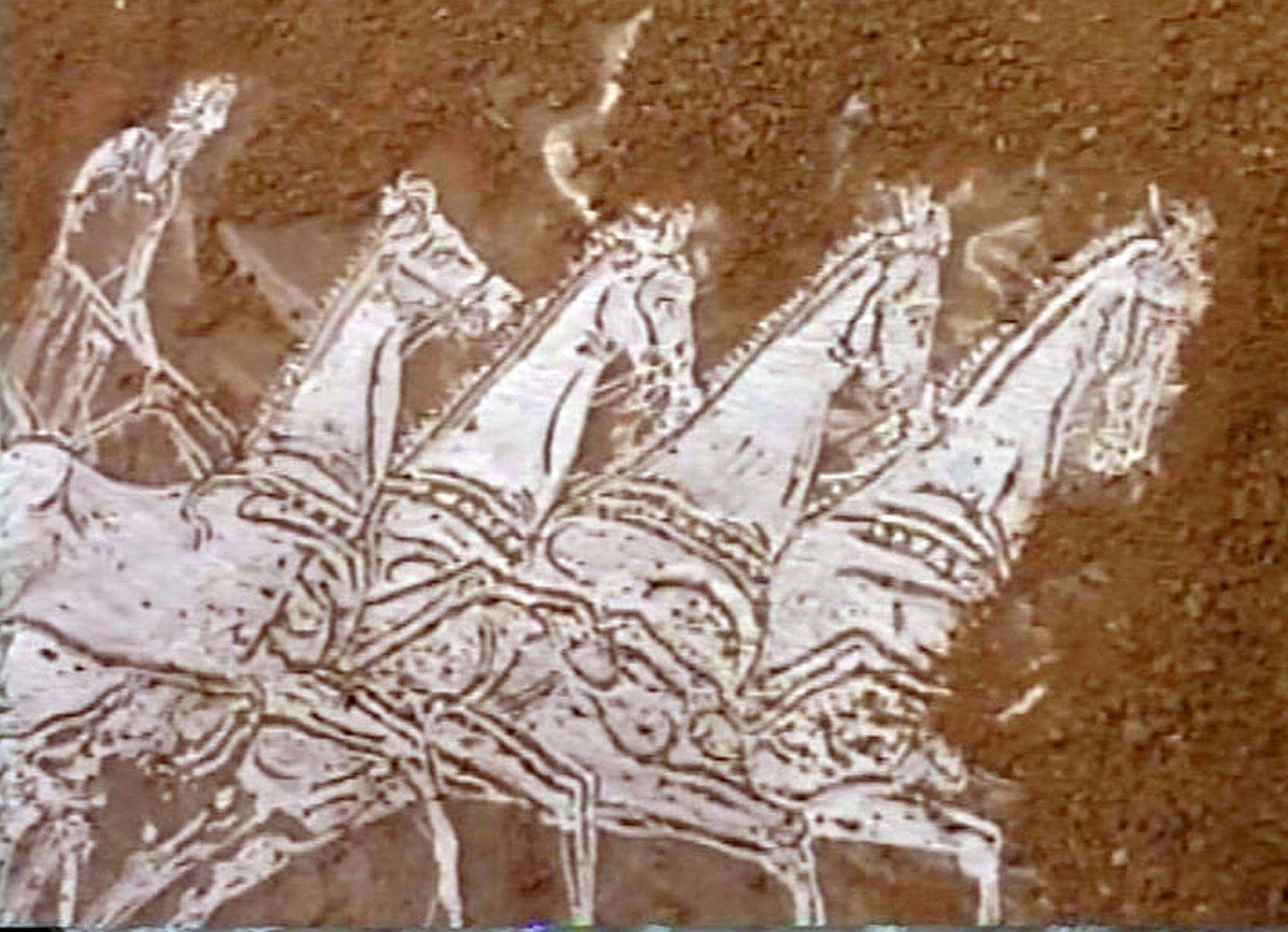

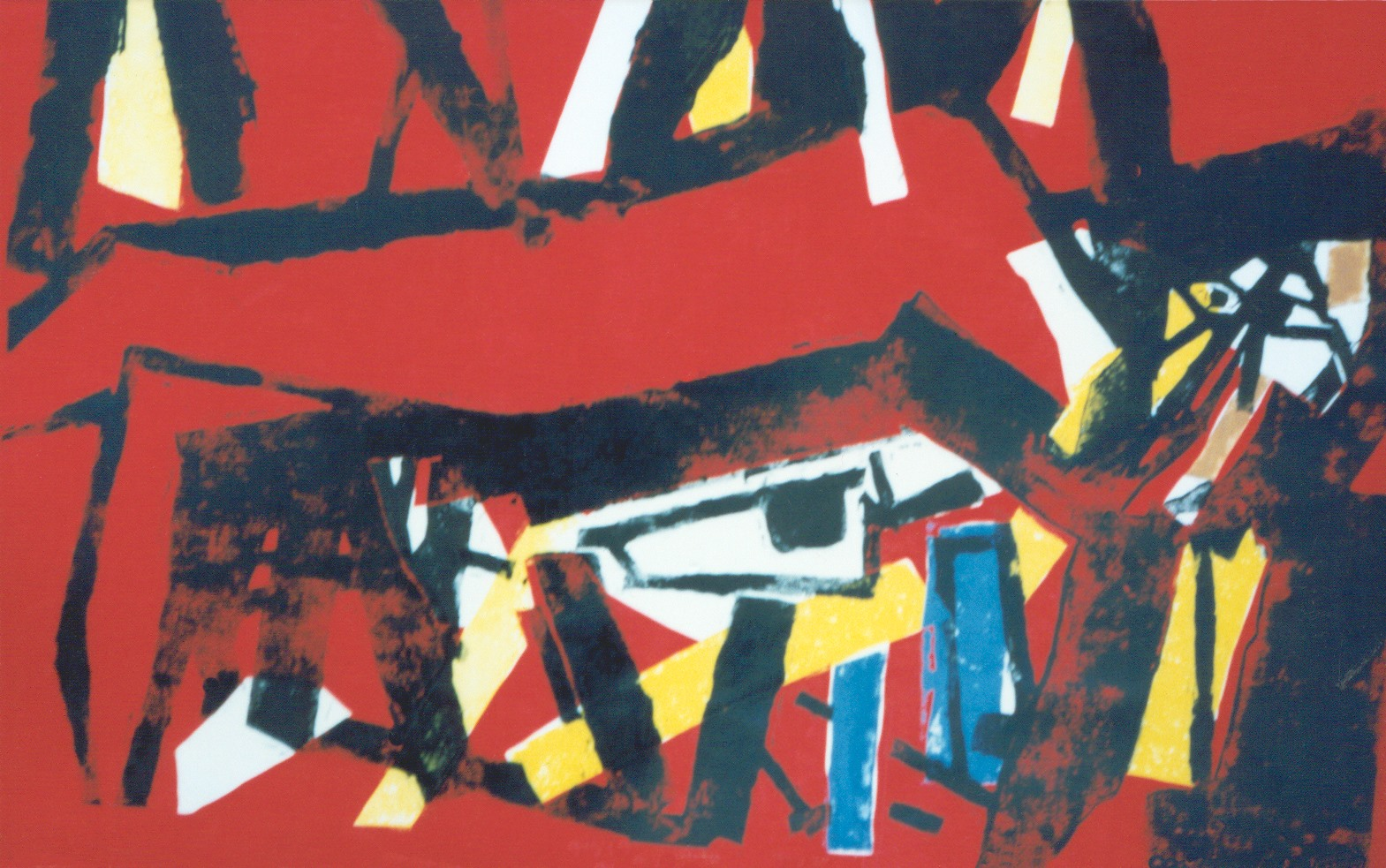

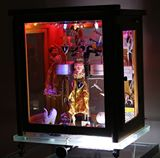

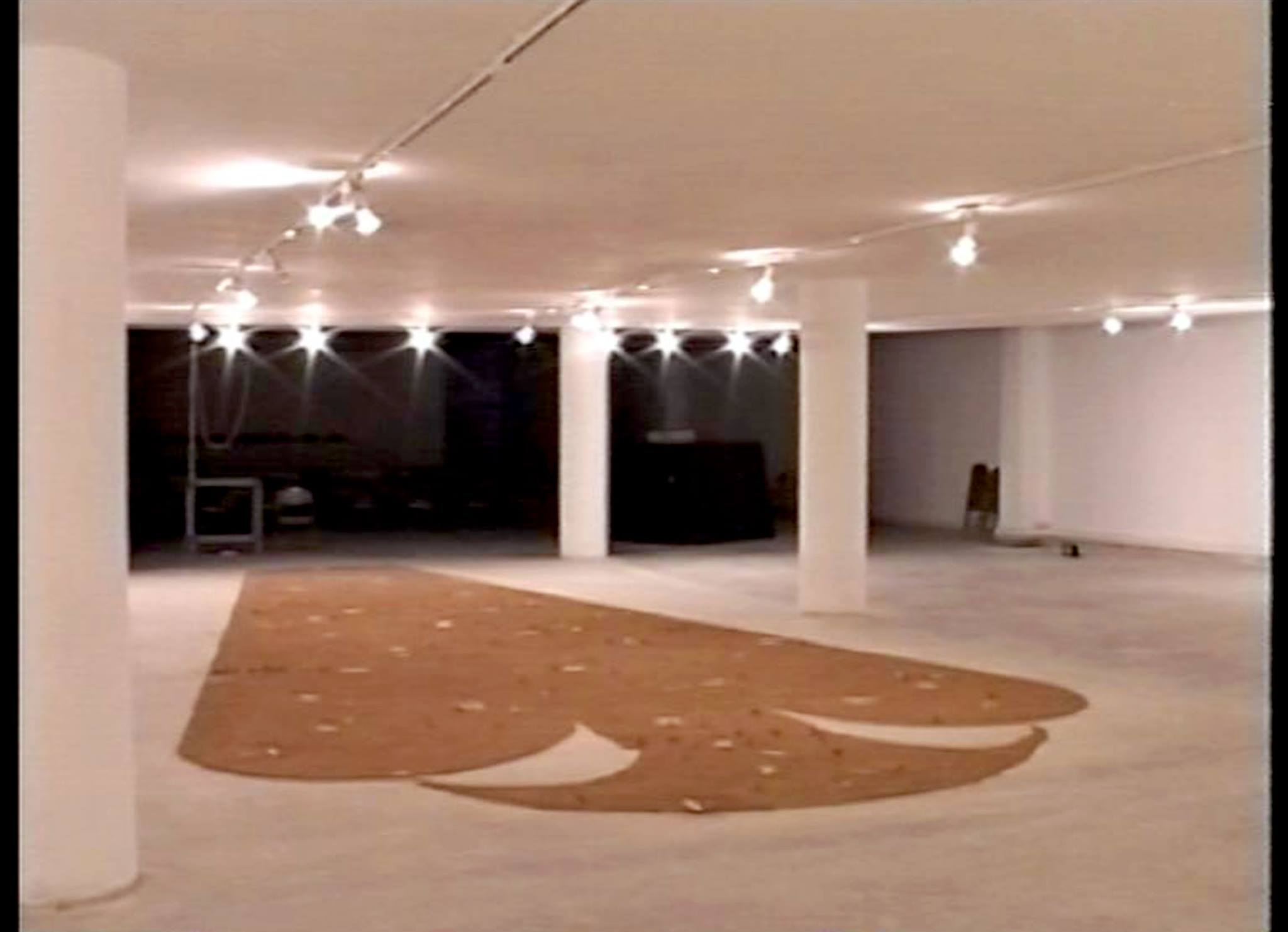

== See also ==
- List of Armenian artists
- List of Armenians
- Culture of Armenia
- Armenian Center for Contemporary Experimental Art
