= Youth: Scenes from Provincial Life II =

2002 autobiographical novel by J. M. Coetzee

- First edition
- Author: J. M. Coetzee
- Language: English
- Genre: Autobiographical novel
- Published: 2002 (Secker and Warburg)
- Publication place: South Africa
- Media type: Print (Paperback)
- Pages: 176 p.
- ISBN: 0-14-200200-3
- OCLC: 53341007
- Preceded by: Boyhood
- Followed by: Summertime

Youth (or Youth: Scenes from Provincial Life II) (2002) is a semi-fictionalised autobiographical novel by J. M. Coetzee, recounting his struggles in 1960s London after fleeing the political unrest of Cape Town. The book was republished as a paperback, simply titled Youth, in 2003 by Vintage Books.

== Plot summary ==
The story begins with the narrator living in Mowbray and studying at the University of Cape Town. After graduating in mathematics and English and in the wake of the Sharpeville massacre he moves to London in the hope of finding inspiration of becoming a poet and finding the woman of his dreams. However he finds none of this and instead, takes up a tedious job as a computer programmer working for IBM his work including checking punched cards submitted to an IBM 7090 for the TSR-2 project . He seeks refuge in the Third Programme and cinema, falling in love with Monica Vitti. He feels alienated from the natives and never settles down, always aware of the scorn they see him with. He engages in a series of affairs, none of them fulfilling to him in the slightest. He scorns people's inabilities to see through his dull exterior into the 'flame' inside him; none of the women he meets evokes in him the passion that, according to him, would allow his artistry to flourish and thus produce great poetry. By the end of the book he is working for International Computers on the Atlas project.
