= Summertime (novel) =

Autofiction novel by J. M. Coetzee

- First edition
- Author: J. M. Coetzee
- Language: English
- Publisher: Harvill Secker (UK)
- Publication date: 3 September 2009
- Publication place: South Africa
- Media type: Print (Hardback)
- Pages: 224 pp
- ISBN: 978-1-84655-318-9
- OCLC: 373483224
- Preceded by: Youth

Summertime is a 2009 novel by South African-born Nobel laureate J. M. Coetzee. It is the third and final instalment of Scenes from Provincial Life, a series of fictionalized memoirs by Coetzee (the first two being Boyhood and Youth) and details the life of one John Coetzee from the perspective of five people who have known him.

The novel largely takes place in the mid to late 1970s, largely in Cape Town, although there are also important scenes in more remote South African settings. While there are obvious similarities between the actual writer of the novel, J. M. Coetzee, and the subject of the novel, John Coetzee, there are some differences - most notably that the John Coetzee of the novel is reported as having died. Within the novel, the opinions and thoughts of the five people are compiled and interpreted by a fictitious biographer, who also adds fragments from John Coetzee's notebooks.

It was shortlisted for the 2009 Booker Prize. Coetzee was already a two-time winner of the award and it is for this reason that literary commentator Merritt Moseley believes he did not win it for Summertime.

== Reception ==
Writing for The Guardian, Thomas Jones concluded his reviews by stating, "Summertime is both an elegant request that the sum of Coetzee's existence as a public figure should be looked for only in his writing, and ample evidence, once again, why that request should be honoured."

"The book's insistent geographic mobility reminds us of the myriad routes and modes of interconnection and displacement that constitute Coetzee's global world, which overlaps and diverges from those of his increasingly international readership ... Summertime reminds us of the persistence with which Coetzee has been drawn to the effects of displacement and homelessness in his novels.
