= Sonia Balassanian =

Iranian-born American painter of Armenian descent (b. 1942)

- سونیا بالاسانیان; Սոնյա Պալասանյան
- Born: Sonia Amirian; 1942 (age 83–84); Arak, Pahlavi Iran
- Other names: Sonia Amirian Balassanian, Sonia Balasanian-Amirian, Sonia Palasanean, Sonia Amirean
- Education: Pennsylvania Academy of the Fine Arts, Pratt Institute
- Occupations: Artist, curator
- Known for: Painting
- Spouse: Edward Balassanian

Sonia Balassanian (Armenian: Սոնյա Պալասանյան; Persian: سونیا بالاسانیان; born 1942) née Sonia Amirian, is an Iranian-born painter, sculptor, and curator, of Armenian ethnicity. She co-founded the Armenian Center for Contemporary Experimental Art. Balassanian lives in New York City and Yerevan.

== Biography ==
Sonia Balassanian was born in 1942 in Arak, Pahlavi Iran. In 1966, she emigrated to the United States. Balassanian attended the Pennsylvania Academy of the Fine Arts, where she received a BA degree (1970); and Pratt Institute, where she received a MFA degree (1978).

In her early career she worked in installation art with sculptural elements, and later she worked in video art. She also worked on theater set design in New York City. In 1983, she was in the group exhibition, "Seven Women–Image Impact" at MoMA PS1, other artists included in the exhibition were Ana Mendieta, Anne Pitrone, Judy Rifka, Dena Shottenkirk, Susan Rothenberg, and Mimi Smith.

In 1992, she and her husband Edward Balassanian co-founded the Armenian Center for Contemporary Experimental Art (Armenian: Նորարար Փորձառական Արվեստի Կենտրոն, romanized: Norar Pordzarakan Arvesti Kentovon). The center got its start with two seminal exhibitions, "The Show of the Nine" or "9" (1992), and "Identification" (1993).

Her work is found in the museum collection at the Tehran Museum of Contemporary Art. She has artist files at the Smithsonian American Art and Portrait Gallery Library.

== See also ==
- List of Armenian women artists
- List of Iranian women artists
