= I See the Sun =

1962 novel by Nodar Dumbadze

- Author: Nodar Dumbadze
- Original title: მე ვხედავ მზეს
- Language: Georgian
- Genre: novel
- Publication date: 1962
- Publication place: Georgia
- Media type: Print (Hardback)
- Pages: 205 pages

I See the Sun (Georgian: მე ვხედავ მზეს, Me vkhedav mzes), published in 1962, is the second novel written by Nodar Dumbadze. In 1965, Georgian director Lana Gogoberidze made a film with the same title based on this novel. The novel was translated into English in 1968.

The story of the novel is set in the war years and describes the difficult situation in the villages and the fear the people felt for their loved ones who were fighting at the front. The main character Sosoia is a teenager in love with the blind Khatia who hopes to be cured at some time in the future by an operation.
