= The Sunny Night =

1967 novel written by Nodar Dumbadze

- Author: Nodar Dumbadze
- Original title: მზიანი ღამე
- Translator: George Nakashidse
- Language: Georgian
- Genre: novel
- Publisher: Washington Square Press
- Publication date: 1968
- Publication place: Georgia
- Media type: Print (Hardback)
- Pages: 209 pages

The Sunny Night (Georgian: მზიანი ღამე) is a novel written by Nodar Dumbadze in 1967. It was translated by George Nakashidse in 1968. The ASIN of the novel is B0007DN0BQ.

== Plot ==
The narrator is a student from Tbilisi. Teymo's mother returns from jail where she had spent twelve years, and Teymo at twenty is thrown from hell and back again as he at last accepts her return. He falls in and out of love, invites trouble by helping an imprisoned classmate, sleeps with an accommodating lady, finds at last his true mate. Amid shouting, heckling, students and ""Party"" student meetings, seas and sunsets, drinks and talk, Teymo emerges whole, strong, outrageous, delightful, and even the death of his mother is a dedication.
