= Granny, Iliko, Illarion, and I =

1960 novel by Nodar Dumbadze

Me, Grandma, Iliko and Ilarion
- Author: Nodar Dumbadze
- Original title: მე, ბებია, ილიკო და ილარიონი
- Language: Georgian
- Subject: Humanism, World War II
- Genre: Novel, Romance, Humour
- Publication date: 1960
- Publication place: Georgia
- Media type: Print (Hardback)
- Pages: 200 pages

Me, Grandma, Iliko and Ilarion (Georgian: მე, ბებია, ილიკო და ილარიონი) is a first novel written by Nodar Dumbadze in 1960. Author accompanies his characters through the seasons, through the war and then the peace. The “Me” in the title is Zuriko, an orphan who lives with his grandmother Olgha.

== Plot ==
The life of Zuriko an orphan passes in the hands of his grandmother Olgha and weirdly funny and loving neighbors, Iliko and Ilarion. Despite war and famine, these people never lose their sense of humour. Iliko and Ilarion constantly prank each other in a series of practical jokes, though they are closest friends. Meanwhile, Zuriko writes his first poem and his first love letter. The time passes. Zuriko graduates in Tbilisi and comes back to his village.
