= Mimi Smith (artist) =

American visual artist (born 1942)

- Born: May 13, 1942 (age 84); Brookline, Massachusetts, United States
- Education: Massachusetts College of Art; Rutgers University
- Movement: Feminist art; Conceptual art

Mimi Smith (born May 13, 1942) is an American visual artist. She is a pioneer in early feminist and conceptual art focusing on clothing sculpture and drawing installation. She lives and works in New York City.

== Early life and education ==
Born in Brookline, Massachusetts, Smith spent her early years in Boston. In 1949, her family moved to Milton, Massachusetts where she grew up. She attended the Massachusetts College of Art and graduated with a BFA degree in 1963. In May of the same year, she moved to New York City. Smith enrolled in Rutgers University and received a MFA degree in 1966.

== Artwork ==
=== Clothes sculptures ===
During her graduate studies at Rutgers, Mimi Smith began making sculpture that utilized clothing as both content and form. Smith's early works were prescient of feminist and clothing art and predicted the feminist artists fascination with clothing as an extension of the body. Using the autobiographical as a point of departure, her work often parallels everyday moments. In 1965, she produced Recycle Coat, Model Dress and Bikini. These works were made of plastic, an important material for Smith. In 1966, she produced a room-size installation called The Wedding for her thesis show at Rutgers University. Designed as a plastic box that viewers were not permitted to enter, it contained a plastic wedding gown with a thirty-foot train. Within the next year she was to create her signature piece Steel Wool Peignoir. About the piece Smith said, “Growing up in the 1950s, I associated peignoirs [with] storybook romance… steel wool, however, was the stuff of everyday life… I felt that [the materials] combined the reality of my life with the romance of what I thought it would be”. That same year she made Maternity Dress and Girdle. These pieces were also prescient in their acknowledgment that fashion is part of what helps to construct women's individual and social identities. In 1968 Smith made a conceptual piece about her own pregnancy that played on the idea of knitting baby clothes. Knit Baby was conceived as a knit-your-own-baby kit, with instructions to enable any woman, or man, to knit themselves a baby.

=== Knotted thread and tapemeasure drawings ===
Smith moved with her husband and two children from New York City to Cleveland, Ohio in the early 1970s. During this time, Smith created a series of wall drawings that replicated furniture, architectural features, and rooms in her home using knotted thread and tape measures to mark their precise dimensions. With this series, Smith used the fundamental parameters of conceptual art to tell her own story. When exhibited, the individual works are arranged on gallery walls in a ghostly reproduction of the domestic sphere. In a review of Smith's solo show at Kustera Tilton Gallery in 1999, art critic Roberta Smith wrote “These wall drawings combine elements of high conceptualism with instant accessibility and a feminist viewpoint”.

=== Installation art and artist books ===
Smith and her family moved back to New York City in the mid 1970s. At this time, Smith's work began to focus on installations and drawings about television news, the environment and nuclear threat. Installations ranged in size and included individual drawings hung directly on the wall to ten-foot tall paper houses suspended from the ceiling. These works often included audio of the artist reciting the daily news accompanied by her own phrases. Simultaneously, she began making artists books and in 1983 she published This is a Test with Visual Studies Workshop. This is a Test was produced in an edition of 700 and deals with nuclear disaster told through television news.

=== Recent clothes and drawings ===
From the 1990s to the present, Smith has returned to clothing sculpture producing pieces that comment on the lives of women in the workplace and the military (Slave Ready Corporate, 1993, To Die For, 1991, and Camouflage Maternity Dress, 2004) as well as illness, the environment and aging (Protectors Against Illness, and Coverings for an Environmental Catastrophe). Continuing with her drawing practice, Smith's ongoing series, Timelines tracks the aging process of a woman through her clothes. Consisting of individual drawings displayed in a line, each Timeline depicts a specific article of clothing viewed from birth to seventy-nine, the average life expectancy of a woman.

== Exhibitions, grants, writings ==
Mimi Smith has exhibited extensively throughout the United States and internationally. Her many exhibits include a retrospective ‘Steel Wool Politics’ at the ICA Philadelphia, a survey show at Ramapo College, NJ, and solo shows at Anna Kustera Gallery, NYC; Group shows ‘WACK! Art and the Feminist Revolution’ at LA MOCA, ‘Building Blocks’ at RISD Museum, ‘Artwear’ at Fine Arts Museums of San Francisco, ‘Addressing the Century, 100 Years of Art and Fashion’ at the Haywood Gallery, London, Committed to Print at MoMA, NYC, 'Lines of Resolution: Drawing at the Advent of Television and Video' at the Menil Collection, and at many other museums. She has been the recipient of grants from the National Endowment of the Arts, the New York Foundation on the Arts and the Joan Mitchell Foundation. Among the many publications that have written about her work are Artforum, Art in America, Art News, Frieze, and Time Out magazines, as well as The New York Times, Dallas Morning News, and several books.

== Public collections ==
- Arkansas Arts Center, Little Rock, Arkansas
- Franklin Furnace, New York
- The Getty Research Center, Special Collections
- The Institute of Contemporary Art, Tokyo, Japan
- Museum of Modern Art, New York
- The Newark Museum, Newark, New Jersey
- The RISD Museum, Providence, Rhode Island
- Spencer Art Museum, Lawrence, Kansas
- The Fogg Art Museum, Cambridge, Massachusetts
- The Menil Collection
