= Boyhood: Scenes from Provincial Life =

1997 fictionalised autobiographical work by J. M. Coetzee

Boyhood
- First edition
- Author: J. M. Coetzee
- Cover artist: Roderick Field
- Language: English
- Genre: Autobiographical novel
- Publisher: Secker & Warburg
- Publication date: September 1997
- Publication place: South Africa
- Media type: Print (Paperback)
- Pages: 166 pp (UK paperback)
- ISBN: 0-09-926827-2
- OCLC: 39713641
- Followed by: Youth

Boyhood: Scenes from Provincial Life is a fictionalised autobiographical work by J. M. Coetzee first published in 1997. The book focuses on his years spent growing up in South Africa. specially on his troubled time in Worcester but looks back to happier times living in a large house in Rosebank, Cape Town.

== Description ==
It serves as the first volume in a trilogy, followed by Youth and Summertime. The three works were later collected under the title Scenes from Provincial Life.

Told in the third person, the narrative follows Coetzee's younger self growing up in Worcester, a provincial town in South Africa, after the family's move from Cape Town. The young protagonist struggles with feelings of displacement, discomfort, and alienation in his new environment, where he faces the physical discomforts of rural life, including swarms of insects, and yearns for freedom and escape, symbolized by his wish for a horse. His mother instead buys him a bicycle, which becomes a central object of family tension and personal guilt.

The story explores themes of identity, guilt, and complicity, conflicting loyalties within his family. The protagonist navigates complex racial and social dynamics in apartheid-era South Africa. He faces bullying from Afrikaans-speaking classmates due to his English background, and observes injustices, such as the racially motivated flogging of a young Black boy named Eddie, which leaves him haunted by his silence.

The novel also delves into the boy's internal conflicts regarding religion and politics. He claims to be Roman Catholic despite his family's lack of religious affiliation, leading to further alienation. He also harbors a secret fascination with Russia, defying the prevailing anti-Communist sentiment of the time.

== Characters ==
- The Boy (John Coetzee) The protagonist, depicted in the third person, is a sensitive, intelligent, and introverted child based on J.M. Coetzee himself. He struggles with feelings of alienation both at home and at school. He seeks his mother's approval and grapples with guilt, identity, and moral dilemmas throughout the story.
- The Mother A strong-willed, practical woman who plays a central role in her son's life. She is fiercely protective and determined, shown in her efforts to learn to ride a bicycle despite ridicule. She is also a source of both comfort and tension for the boy, who longs to be her favorite.
- The Father A distant and often sarcastic figure. He struggles professionally after losing his job in Cape Town, leading to the family's move to Worcester. He tends to mock both his wife and son, which strains his relationship with them.
- Michael A popular and athletic boy in the scout troop. He rescues the protagonist from drowning during a camping trip, which leaves a lasting impression on the boy, who believes this act marks him as “special.”
- Wolf Heller The father's employer in Worcester, who brought him into his business after his failure in the civil service. Heller represents one of the few Jewish figures in the boy's limited world.
- Eddie A young Black boy who teaches the protagonist how to ride a bicycle. Later, Eddie is subjected to corporal punishment in a racially charged incident, which deeply troubles the boy and becomes a moment of painful reflection on guilt and complicity.
- School Teachers and Classmates Various unnamed teachers and classmates appear throughout the narrative, often representing the oppressive social and racial hierarchies of the time. The teachers frequently resort to corporal punishment, while classmates bully the boy for his English-speaking background and his perceived differences.

== Style ==
The book presents an ambiguous form of autobiography. Coetzee himself avoids labeling the book as either fiction or memoir, using third-person narration and omitting typical autobiographical markers. His writing reflects deep skepticism about the possibility of fully truthful self-representation, given the distortions of memory and self-interest. In Boyhood, memory is shown to be selective and prone to fictionalization, blurring the line between fact and invention. Coetzee's choice of third-person narration and present tense seeks to preserve the “truth” of the past by distancing the adult narrator. However, retrospective details and psychological insights betray the adult author's presence throughout the narrative.
