= Nodar Dumbadze =

Georgian writer (1928–1984)

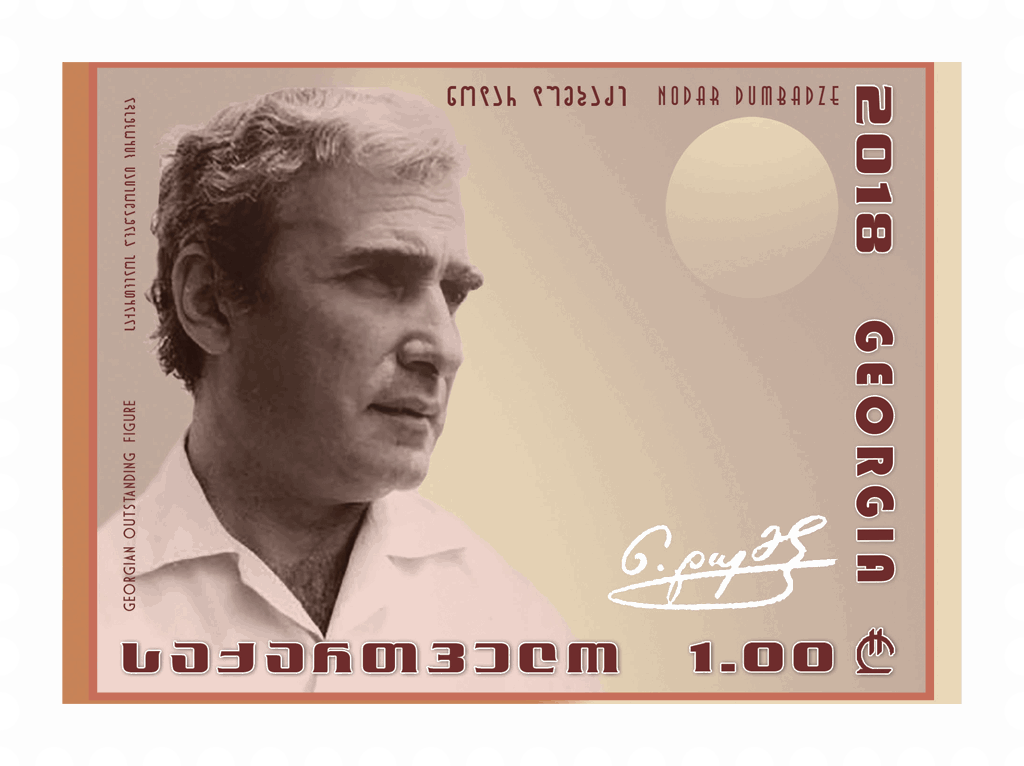
- Dumbadze on a 2018 stamp of Georgia
- Born: July 14, 1928; Tbilisi, Georgian SSR, Soviet Union
- Died: September 14, 1984 (aged 56); Tbilisi, Georgian SSR, Soviet Union
- Resting place: Mtatsminda Pantheon
- Education: Tbilisi State University
- Occupations: Novelist, journalist
- Writing career
- Language: Georgian
- Years active: 1960–1984
- Genres: Comic novel, Humour, Novel
- Subjects: Antimilitarism, Humanism
- Notable works: Granny, Iliko, Illarion, and I (1960); I See the Sun (1962)

Nodar Dumbadze (Georgian: ნოდარ დუმბაძე, July 14, 1928 – September 14, 1984) was a Georgian writer.

== Biography ==
Born in Tbilisi, he graduated from the Faculty of Economics at Tbilisi State University in 1950. His first poems and humorous stories appeared in the Georgian press in the same year. He edited the satirical magazine Niangi from 1967 until 1972, when he became a secretary of the Union of Georgian Writers and a member of the presidium of the Union of Soviet Writers in 1972. Most of his fame came through his novels Me, Grandma, Iliko and Ilarioni (მე, ბებია, ილიკო და ილარიონი; 1960), I See the Sun (მე ვხედავ მზეს; 1962), The Sunny Night (მზიანი ღამე; 1967), Don’t Be Afraid, Mother! (ნუ გეშინია, დედა!; 1971), The White Banners (თეთრი ბაირაღები; 1973), and The Law of Eternity (მარადისობის კანონი; 1978). His works are remarkable for simplicity and lyricism of the prose, humor, and melancholy coupled with optimism. He was awarded the Shota Rustaveli State Prize in 1975 and the Lenin Prize in 1980. Most of his major works have been dramatized and/or filmed. He died on 14 September 1984 in Tbilisi and was buried in the city, at the Mziuri Park, which he founded in 1982 for the capital's children. In September 2009, his body was moved to the Mamadaviti temple in the Mtatsminda Pantheon.

== Works ==
Nodar Dumbadze's first works, published between 1956 and 1957, were three books of humorous stories. In 1957, he resigned from his lab work to fully immerse himself in his literary career. He worked in the editorial departments of various journals and in the screenwriting division of Kartuli Pilmi.

He continued to publish humorous stories, such as his "Village Boy" collection in 1959. His semi-autobiographical novel Granny, Iliko, Illarion, and I was released in 1960 and was very successful. The novel was set in a Georgian village during the years of World War II. All able-bodied men left to fight, leaving only women and elderly men behind. At the center of the novel is a young orphan, Zurikela, his grandmother, and two sharp-tongued but wise and generous elderly neighbors who help watch over the boy.

Dumbadze's next novel I See the Sun (1962) was also autobiographical and takes place during the war. It described the difficult situation in the villages and the fear people felt for their loved ones who were fighting at the front. Sosoia, the teenage protagonist, was a teenager who loved the blind Khatia. Khatia's blindness, however, was cured at the end of the novel.

In Dumbadze's 1967 novel The Sunny Night the hero struggled to find a way to re-establish a connection with his mother, who just returned from twelve years of exile. In a further complication, the hero must decide whether or not to save the life of the villain who caused his family's ruin.

Don't Be Afraid, Mama! (1971) depicted the life of Soviet border guards. Masculine friendships, the tragedy of losing a comrade, and the pain of unrequited love are all addressed in a lyric manner typical of Dumbadze. When preparing this novel, Dumbadze received special permission to serve in a border-patrol unit.

Dumbadze's 1973 novel The White Flags followed the fate of a man convicted of a murder he did not commit. Many of the characters were criminals, who struggled with their relationship with society and themselves.

Dumbadze's final novel was Law of Eternity, written in 1978. In this work, a gravely ill hospital patient faced the concept of the struggle between good and evil.

The short story Hellados told the story of a Greek boy departing for his historic homeland. At the last moment, however, he lacks the strength to part with the town of Sukhumi and the friends he has made there. In order to get back to Sukhumi, he jumps off the steamship and dies in the sea.

In Kukaracha, one of Dumbadze's last short novels, a policeman takes pity on a criminal, who then shoots and kills the police officer.

The story Blood Knot told the story of a boy, who, like Dumbadze, was born in 1928 and lost his parents in the Great Terror year of 1937. Like Dumbadze, he is sent to live with relatives in the village.

=== Novels ===
- Granny, Iliko, Illarion, and I — 1960
- I See the Sun — 1962
- The Sunny Night — 1967
- Don’t Be Afraid, Mother! — 1971
- The White Banners — 1973
- The Law of Eternity — 1978

=== Short novels ===
- Kukaracha — 1981

=== Short stories ===
- Hellados
- What the falcon is doing in a city?!
- Sematary
- Chinkas
- Romani
- Khazarula
- Sun
- Diderot
- Dog
- Ungrateful
- Bullfighting
- Do not wake up
- Longing
- Mother
- Bird
- Blood
- Kantsi (horn)
- Timur
- Astvats! Inchu, Hamar!
- Taliko

== Awards ==
He won numerous awards during his career, including the Shota Rustaveli Prize (highest arts award in Georgia) in 1975, the Lenin Komsomol Prize (1966) and the Lenin Prize (1980).

== Political office positions ==
He was a deputy to the Supreme Soviet of the Georgian SSR from 1971 to 1978 and to the Supreme Soviet of the USSR from 1979 to 1984. In 1974 he was named a secretary of the Georgian Writers Union, and from 1981 until his death he served as Chairman of the Union.
