= Armenian Center for Contemporary Experimental Art =

Armenian Center for Contemporary Experimental Art (ACCEA)
- Նորարար Փորձառական Արվեստի Կենտրոն
- Location within Armenia
- Established: 1992; 34 years ago
- Location: 1/3 Pavstos Buzand Blvd, Yerevan, Armenia
- Coordinates: 40.1755127°N 44.5178857°E
- Visitors: 15,000
- Founders: Sonia Balassanian and Edward Balassanian
- Website: Official site

Armenian Center for Contemporary Experimental Art (or ACCEA; Armenian: Նորարար Փորձառական Արվեստի Կենտրոն, romanized: Norar Pordzarakan Arvesti Kentovon, or NPAK) is a contemporary art institution founded in 1992, and located in Yerevan, capital of Armenia.

== About ==
ACCEA/NPAK was founded in 1992 by Sonia Balassanian and her husband Edward Balassanian, just after the collapse of the Soviet Union and creation of Newly Independent State (NIS) of Armenia. The mission of the organization is the introduction of international contemporary art in Armenia; as well as discovery and encouragement of Armenian contemporary art. ACCEA/NPAK is the only center for contemporary experimental art in the Southern Caucasus, showing “cutting-edge” art of painting, sculpture, installation, video and performing arts.

The ACCEA/NPAK organized the first official participation of Armenia at Venice Biennale of Art in 1995. The effort was continued without interruption until 2009 (eight consecutive times); after which the Ministry of Culture of Armenia took over the effort.

The date of formal incorporation of ACCEA/NPAK as a non-profit foundation in Armenia was 1994. The organization is also registered as a non-profit 501(c)3 organization in the State of New York, U.S.

== Official Pavilion of Armenia at Venice Biennale ==
In 1995, by the initiative and direction of the Balassanian couple, historically for the first time, Republic of Armenia was represented at the international fine arts exhibition of Venice Biennale. They continued organizing the Armenian Pavilions at Venice Biennale without interruption until 2009 (8 consecutive times). Armenian Pavilions at Venice Biennale have been realized exclusively by donations collected from the Armenian Diaspora.

- 1995: 46th Venice Biennale Artists: Karen Andressian, Samvel Baghdasaryan Commissioner and Curator: Sonia Balassanian Organized by: Armenian Center for Contemporary Experimental Art
- 1997: 47th Venice Biennale Title: Armenia and the Diaspora Artists: Sonia Balassanian, Atom Egoyan, Arman Grigoryan, Azat Sarkissian, Stepan Veranian Commissioner and Curator: Anelka Grigorian Organized by: Armenian Center for Contemporary Experimental Art
- 1999: 48th Venice Biennale Title: Post Factum: Earth, Space and Dream Artist: Narek Avetissian Curator: Stepan Veranian Commissioner: Edward Balassanian Organized by: Armenian Center for Contemporary Experimental Art
- 2001: 49th Venice Biennale Title: Work in Progress Artists: Sona Abgarian, Narine Aramian, Mher Azatian, Nora Badalian, Diana Hakobian, Ara Hovsepian, Hamlet Hovsepian, David Kareyan, Tigran Khachatrian, Hovhannes Margarian, Karine Matsakian, Tatev Mnatsakanian, Samuel Saghatelian, Harutyun Simonian, Arpine Tokmajian Commissioner and Curator: Edward Balassanian Organized by: Armenian Center for Contemporary Experimental Art
- 2003: 50th Venice Biennale Title: No Return Artists: David Kareyan, Eva Khachatrian Commissioner and Curator: Edward Balassanian Organized by: Armenian Center for Contemporary Experimental Art
- 2005: 51st Venice Biennale Title: Resistance through Art Artists: Sona Abgarian, Vahram Aghasian, Diana Hakobian, Tigran Khachatrian Curator: David Kareyan Commissioner: Edward Balassanian Organized by: Armenian Center for Contemporary Experimental Art
- 2007: 52nd Venice Biennale Title: Who is the victim? Artist: Sonia Balassanian Curator: Nina Montmann Honorary Commissioner: Jean Boghossian Organized by: Armenian Center for Contemporary Experimental Art
- 2009: 53rd Venice Biennale Title: Gayane Khachaturian: Painter of Dreams Artist: Gayane Khachaturian. Curator and Commissioner: Edward Balassanian. Honorary Commissioner: Jean Boghossian Organized by: Armenian Center for Contemporary Experimental Art

== Sources ==
- Active departments of the Center in 2011 are Department of Fine Arts (Painting, sculpture, installation video arts, etc.), Department of Theater, Cinema and Video, and Department of Architecture.
- In the past, from time-to-time active departments of the Center have been departments of music (experimental and rock) and literature.
- Since April 1996 ACCEA/NPAK has been operating at a 1,823 m2 (19,450 square foot) space provided by the Government of Armenia. The venue is located at the heart of Yerevan in walking distance from the Republic Square, where the Prime Minister's office, several ministries and the National Museum of History and National Gallery of Paintings are located.

== Activities ==
Main objectives of ACCEA/NPAK have been, and continue to be, encouraging and assisting free and uninhibited expression, and opening “new horizons” in arts and artistic expression of Armenian artists, as well as discovery of new and young artistic talents and providing them opportunity of presenting their work. This is the main objective of annual festival of alternative art organized by ACCEA/NPAK. At the center active parts are played by “The Project Room”, where artists present new and experimental projects, and the “Open Studio”, which has been initiated in 2011. Here individual artist creates a single work during a limited period, showing the creative process as well as the result at the end of the period.
As an indicator of successes of the center suffice it to state that while in 1992-1994 period it started with one group exhibition per year, during 2001 through 2010 period the number of individual and group exhibitions have fluctuated between 10 and 20 per year.
During the last decade parallel with exhibitions the center has organized two international festivals of experimental theater and video (short and feature films) per year.
In appreciation of cultural services provided to the Armenian contemporary art in early 2002, Government of Armenia issued a decree by which the space occupied by ACCEA/NPAK was provided to it for indefinite period free of charge.
In 2003 by sponsorship of late writer and architect Rouben H. Avanessian (Pen-name: R. Ben) ACCEA/NPAK initiated erection of quadruple-scale bronze cast of forefather of Armenian Contemporary art Yervand Kotchar's “Melancholy” sculpture in Yerevan, in front of the entrance of the center. This is an unprecedented phenomenon in social and cultural life of the Capital of Armenia.

=== Educational activities ===
On the informal level of education ACCEA/NPAK as a rule always publishes booklets and sometimes extensive catalogues for exhibitions, which contain texts by curators describing the conceptual basis and arguments leading to organization of events and exhibitions. Sometimes the publications include artist's statement. The body of these publications form an informal public education initiative for introducing and promoting contemporary concepts of art.

ACCEA/NPAK is in the process of initiating Independent Study Program (ISP) based on the model of New York City's Whitney Museum ISP, where newly graduated artists get opportunity to meet experienced masters in the arts and culture and enrich their insight and global appreciation of art.
