= Full Intention =

English house music duo

- Also known as: Hustlers Convention, Greed, Disco-Tex, Miami Ice, Deep Down, Arizona, Essence, Hustle Espanol, Groove City, Met Life
- Origin: London, England
- Genres: House, disco house, deep house
- Occupations: DJs, record producers, remixers
- Instruments: Keyboards, turntables, synthesizers, samplers, drum machine, music sequencer
- Years active: 1994–present
- Labels: Full Intention Records, Dtension, Eye Industries, Sugar Daddy Records, Rulin Records, Virgin, Stress Records, FFRR, AM:PM, Altra Moda Music, Atlantic, Suara Records, OFF Recordings, Toolroom Records, BluFin Records, DMC, Manifesto, Sony Music, Strictly Rythmn, Ministry of Sound, Defected
- Members: Jon Pearn; Michael Gray
- Website: www.fullintention.com

Full Intention are a British house music duo composed of Michael Gray and Jon Pearn. They are best known as prolific producers and remixers. They have reworked songs for varied artists such as the Sugababes, Whitney Houston, Mariah Carey, and Frankie Knuckles, among others.

== Biography ==
In the early 1990s, Gray and Pearn released several records as the group Greed, like "Give Me", "Love" and "Gonna Let You Go". As the group Hustlers Convention, Jon Pearn and Michael Gray produced their own house tracks and remixed many others, including "Street life" by C. J. Lewis and "Got Myself Together" by the Bucketheads. Their first release was The Groovers delight EP in 1992 on Stress Records.

They have appeared in the US Hot Dance Music/Club Play chart three times with their own singles, first under the name Arizona feat. Zeitia with "Slide on the Rhythm", which reached number one in 1993, and with "America (I Love America)" under the Full Intention name, a number one hit from 1996. They are also perhaps most well known for their remix of the 1995 club classic "So In Love With You" by Duke.

In 1997, they released a song as the act Sex-O-Sonique called "I Thought it was You", which went to number one in the 1997 UK dance singles chart on 6 December, pushing The Prodigy "Smack my bitch up" off the top spot.

Although many of their remixes for other artists have been successful club hits, they did not return to the chart as artists until 2002, when "I'll Be Waiting" featuring Shena reached number three in the Danc Club Songs of the Billboard. Both members have achieved solo success with Gray releasing singles "The Weekend" and "Borderline" which were club hits, while Pearn has formed a side project Bodyrox.

In 2009, Jon Pearn and Michael Gray released new versions of the Full Intention singles "Once In A Lifetime", "I Will Follow", "Forever" under the label Full Intention Records. In 2010, they released a single entitled "America 2010", remixing their own famous 1996's song. In the late 2010s, the most popular singles of Full Intention were "Keep Pushing" (2016) and "I Miss You" (2017). In 2018, they released a single with Blaze called "Be Yourself".

Full Intention has also released numerous remixes. They released in 2018 a remix of a David Penn song with Lisa Millett entitled "Join Us". Moreover, they have notably released remixes of classic house tracks like Inner City "Big Fun", Frankie Knuckles "Tears", or Black Riot "A Day In The Life".

== Discography ==
=== Albums ===
- 2006 Connected: 10 Years of Full Intention
- 2013 Perspective Mini LP

=== Mixed compilations ===
- 2002 Ministry of Sound - Defected Sessions

=== Singles and EPs ===
- 1994: Full Length Disco Mixes
- 1995: Full Length Disco Mixes 2
- 1996 Full Intention - America (I Love America) (with Nick Clow)
- 1996 Full Intention - The Return of Full Intention
- 1996 Full Intention - Uptown Downtown (with Nick Clow)
- 1996 Full Intention - You Are Somebody (with Nick Clow)
- 1997 Full Intention - America (I Love America) '97 (with Nick Clow)
- 1997 Full Intention - Shake Your Body (Down to the Ground) (with Nick Clow)
- 1997 Full Intention - Dancin' All Night/In the Streets
- 1998 Full Intention - Everybody Loves the Sunshine (with Ernestine Pearce and Xavier Barnett)
- 2001 Full Intention - Can't Get Over You (with Kat Blu)
- 2001 Full Intention - I'm Satisfied
- 2001 Full Intention - I'll Be Waiting (with Shena McSween)
- 2001 Full Intention - Naughty Business
- 2001 Full Intention - I Wanna Thank You
- 2002 Full Intention - Soul Power (with Thea Austin)
- 2002 Full Intention - Blue EP
- 2002 Full Intention - I Need a House Party
- 2003 Full Intention - No One
- 2003 Full Intention - Your Day Is Coming (with Shena McSween)
- 2003 Full Intention - Red EP
- 2003 Full Intention - Green EP
- 2004 Full Intention - Orange EP
- 2004 Full Intention - It's Set to Groove
- 2004 Full Intention - It Hurts Me/Once in a Lifetime (with Xavier Barnett)
- 2004 Full Intention - Purple EP
- 2004 Full Intention - Just The Way
- 2005 Full Intention - La Musique
- 2005 Full Intention - Anniversary EP
- 2006 Full Intention - Your Day Is Coming 2006 (with Shena McSween)
- 2006 Full Intention - I Believe in You (with Lee Muddy Baker)
- 2006 Full Intention - Soul Power 2006 (with Thea Austin)
- 2009 Full Intention - Once in a Lifetime 2009
- 2009 Full Intention - I Will Follow 2009
- 2010 Full Intention - Forever 2009
- 2010 Full Intention - America 2010
- 2010 Full Intention - Earth Turns Around EP
- 2011 Full Intention - Play
- 2011 Full Intention - I'll Be Waiting 2011
- 2011 Full Intention - Signification (with Haze)
- 2012 Full Intention - Jupiter One
- 2012 Full Intention - La Musique 2012
- 2013 Full Intention - Octavia
- 2013 Full Intention - Icon
- 2013 Full Intention - Madness
- 2013 Full Intention - Sacrifice
- 2013 Full Intention - Float On
- 2013 Full Intention - Perspective
- 2013 Full Intention - First Time Ever
- 2013 Full Intention - All Right (feat. Chelonis R. Jones)
- 2013 Full Intention - See Basan
- 2013 Full Intention - Get the Money Right
- 2013 Full Intention - I'll Be
- 2014 Full Intention - Everlasting
- 2014 Full Intention - Feel
- 2014 Full Intention - London
- 2014 Full Intention - Do You Feel
- 2014 Full Intention - Let Me Be (feat. Robert Owens)
- 2014 Full Intention - Nobody Knows
- 2014 Full Intention - Meteor Man
- 2014 Full Intention - Walk Away
- 2014 Full Intention - Upside Down
- 2014 Full Intention - I Will Wait for You
- 2014 Full Intention - Do You Feel / London EP
- 2015 Full Intention - Mentum
- 2015 Full Intention - So Confused (feat. Mira J)
- 2015 Full Intention - Automatic
- 2015 Full Intention - Cova Santa
- 2015 Full Intention - What's in It
- 2015 Full Intention - Like That
- 2015 Full Intention - Who's Getting Down
- 2015 Full Intention - Don't Care What You Do
- 2015 Full Intention - Watching You
- 2015 Full Intention - Meteor Man
- 2016 Full Intention - Good Love
- 2016 Full Intention - All I See Is You
- 2016 Full Intention - Just Go Back (feat. Chelsea Como)
- 2016 Full Intention & Marshall Jefferson & Present Sleezy D – Do You Believe
- 2016 Full Intention - Keep Pushing
- 2016 Full Intention - Dancin'(2016 re-edit)
- 2017 Full Intention - I Miss You (Full Intention Remix)
- 2017 Full Intention & Marshall Jefferson Present Sleezy D – Do You Believe (Remixes)
- 2017 Full Intention - It's Set to Groove 2017 (Uptown Mix)
- 2017 Full Intention - I'll Be Waiting 2017 (Full Intention Remix) (feat. Shena)
- 2017 Full Intention & Dennis Quin - I'm Not A Freak (Original Mix)
- 2018 Full Intention - Be Yourself (feat. Blaze)
- 2018 Full Intention - Simply Living
- 2018 Full Intention & Nick Reach Up - Night Of My Life (Original Mix)
- 2019 Full Intention - The Guitar
- 2021 Full Intention - Sky's The Limit

=== Selected remixes ===
- 1996 East 57th St feat. Donna Allen – "Saturday" (Full Intention Club Mix)
- 1996 Duke – "So In Love With You" (Full Intention Remix)
- 1996 Jamiroquai – "Cosmic Girl" (Full Intention Remix)
- 1997 Ultra Naté – "Free" (Full Intention Club Mix)
- 1997 Black Connection – "Give Me Rhythm" (Full Intention Club Mix)
- 1997 Michelle Gayle – "Do You Know" (Full Intention Vocal Mix)
- 1998 Mica Paris – "Carefree" (Full Intention Mix)
- 1998 The Fog – "Been a Long Time" (Full Intention Remix)
- 1998 Eddie Amador – "House Music" (Full Intention Remix)
- 1999 Masters at Work with India – "To Be In Love" (Full Intention Vocal Mix)
- 1999 Frankie Knuckles (feat. Robert Owens) – "Tears" (Full Intention Mix)
- 1999 The Brand New Heavies – "Saturday Nite" (Full Intention Club Mix)
- 1999 Powerhouse – "What You Need" (Full Intention Power Mix)
- 1999 Da Mob feat. Jocelyn Brown – "It's All Good" (Full Intention Remix)
- 2000 Jennifer Lopez – "Love Don't Cost a Thing" (Full Intention Club Mix)
- 2000 AWA Band – "Timba" (Full Intention Club Mix)
- 2000 Moony – "Dove (I'll Be Loving You)" (Full Intention Vocal Mix)
- 2000 South Street Players – "Who Keeps Changing Your Mind" (Full Intention Club Mix)
- 2001 Shannon – "Let the Music Play" (Full Intention Club Mix)
- 2001 Faithless – "Muhammad Ali" (Full Intention Club Mix)
- 2001 Brandy – "Full Moon" (Full Intention Club Mix)
- 2001 Jamiroquai – "You Give Me Something" (Full Intention Remix)
- 2001 Dina Vass – "The Love I Have For You" (Full Intention Remix)
- 2002 Milky – "Just the Way You Are" (Full Intention Club Mix)
- 2002 Mariah Carey – "Through the Rain" (Full Intention Club Mix)
- 2002 Jamiroquai – "Cosmic Girl" (Full Intention Mix)
- 2002 Deepest Blue – "Shooting Star" (Full Intention Remix)
- 2002 Whitney Houston – "Whatchulookinat" (Full Intention Club Mix)
- 2002 Una Mas – "I Will Follow" (Full Intention Club Mix)
- 2003 Junior Jack – "E Samba" (Full Intention Club Mix)
- 2003 Sugababes – "Hole in the Head" (Full Intention Vocal Mix)
- 2003 Lemar – "Dance (With U)" (Full Intention Club Mix)
- 2003 Christina Milian – "Dip It Low" (Full Intention Club Mix)
- 2003 Sophie Ellis-Bextor – "I Won't Change You" (Full Intention Vocal Mix)
- 2003 Mylène Farmer – "L'Âme-stram-gram" (Full Intention Sultra Mix)
- 2003 Emma Bunton – "Free Me" (Full Intention Sultra Mix)
- 2004 Teena Marie – "I Need Your Love" (Full Intention Remix)
- 2004 George Michael – "Amazing" (Full Intention Club Mix)
- 2004 Duran Duran – "Sunrise" (Full Intention Remix)
- 2005 Bob Sinclar feat. Gary Pine – "Love Generation" (Full Intention Club Mix)
- 2005 Bon Garcon – "Freek U" (Full Intention Club Mix)
- 2005 Supafly vs. Fishbowl – "Let's Get Down" (Full Intention Club Mix)
- 2005 Freemasons feat. Amanda Wilson – "Love on My Mind" (Full Intention Club Mix)
- 2005 Roachford – "River of Love" (Full Intention Vocal Mix)
- 2005 Jennifer Lopez – "Get Right" (Full Intention Mix)
- 2008 DJ Gomi - "Glad I Found You" (Full Intention Vocal Mix)
- 2009 Supafly – "Catch Me When I'm Falling" (Full Intention Remix)
- 2010 Hurts – "Stay" (Full Intention Club Mix)
- 2011 Gravitonas – "Religious" (Full Intention Remix)
- 2012 Paloma Faith – "Just Be" (Full Intention Remix)
- 2012 Supafly feat. Shahin Badar – "Happiness" (Full Intention Remix)
- 2013 The Shapeshifters – "Incredible" (Full Intention Remix)
- 2013 Inner City – "Big Fun" (Full Intention Extended Remix)
- 2013 Inner City – "Big Fun" (Full Intention 88 Remix)
- 2014 Ella Henderson – "Glow" (Full Intention Remix)
- 2014 Peppermint Heaven – "Plenty of Time" (Full Intention Remix)
- 2014 Purple Disco Machine – "Need Someone" (Full Intention Remix)
- 2014 DJ Anna feat. Beverley Ely – "Secret" (Full Intention Remix)
- 2015 L.A. Funk Corporation – "Vertigo (Let's Get Down Tonight)" (Full Intention Remix)
- 2015 Michael Canitrot – "Chain Reaction" (Full Intention Remix)
- 2016 Black Riot – "A Day in the Life" (Full Intention Remix)
- 2016 Malachi feat. Moji – "How It Feels" (Full Intention Remix)
- 2017 Alaia & Gallo feat. Kevin Haden – "Go" (Full Intention Remix)
- 2017 J. Majik featuring Kathy Brown – "Love Is Not a Game" (Full Intention Remix)
- 2017 Ralphi Rosario feat. Linda Clifford – "Wanna Give It Up" (Full Intention Remix)
- 2017 Jimmy Read – "Diamond in the Back" (Full Intention Remix)
- 2018 84Bit – "Dreams" (Full Intention Remix)
- 2018 Slam Dunk'd (feat. Chromeo & Al-P) – "No Price" (Full Intention Remix)
- 2018 David Penn feat. Lisa Millett – "Join Us" (Full Intention Remix)
- 2018 Joe T. Vannelli Project – "Sweetest Day of May" (Full Intention Remix)
- 2019 Debbie Jacobs – "Don't You Want My Love" (Full Intention Extended Disco Mix)
- 2019 Rockers Revenge feat. Donnie Calvin – "Walking on Sunshine" (Full Intention Remix)
- 2019 Rockers Revenge – "What About the People" (Full Intention Remix)
- 2019 Roisto & PowerDress – "All Yours" (Full Intention Remix)
- 2019 Funkatomic – "It's A House Thing" (Full Intention Remix)
- 2020 Aki Bergen feat. Carmen Sherry – "Into My Soul" (Full Intention Remix)
- 2020 Pet Shop Boys feat. Years & Years – "Dreamland" (Full Intention Remix)
- 2020 Alina K. – "Walking Your Path" (Full Intention Remix)
- 2020 Ron Carroll & Alex Kosoglaz – "Don't You Worry" (Full Intention Remix)
- 2020 Birdee, Nick Reach Up, Barbara Tucker – "Free Yourself" (Full Intention Remix)
- 2021 The Fog – "Been A Long Time" (Full Intention 2021 Remix)
- 2022 Matt Goss - "Are You Ready" (Full Intention Remix)
- 2023 David Penn And Sex-O-Sonique – "I Thought It Was You" (Full Intention Remix)
- 2024 Sophie Ellis-Bextor – "I Won't Change You" (Full Intention Remix)
- 2026 Milky – "Just The Way You Are 2026" (Full Intention Radio Mix)

== See also ==
- List of number-one dance hits (United States)
- List of artists who reached number one on the US Dance chart
