= List of Billboard number-one dance singles of 1993 =

Billboard magazine compiled the top-performing dance singles in the United States during 1993 on two Hot Dance Music charts: the Club Play and the Maxi-Singles Sales. Premiered in 1976, the Club Play chart ranked the most-played singles on dance club based on reports from a national sample of club DJs. The Maxi-Singles Sales chart was launched in 1985 to compile the best-selling dance singles based on retail sales across the United States.

== Charts history ==
Chart history
Issue date	Hot Dance Music/Club Play		Hot Dance Music/Maxi-Singles Sales		Ref.
Issue date	Title	Artist(s)	Title	Artist(s)	Ref.
January 2	"It's Gonna Be a Lovely Day"	The S.O.U.L. S.Y.S.T.E.M. featuring Michelle Visage	"Are You Ready to Fly"	Rozalla	
January 9	"It's Gonna Be a Lovely Day"	The S.O.U.L. S.Y.S.T.E.M. featuring Michelle Visage	"Carry On"	Martha Wash	
January 16	"I'm Gonna Get You"	Bizarre Inc featuring Angie Brown	"It's Gonna Be a Lovely Day"	The S.O.U.L. S.Y.S.T.E.M. featuring Michelle Visage	
January 23	"I'm Gonna Get You"	Bizarre Inc featuring Angie Brown	"It's Gonna Be a Lovely Day"	The S.O.U.L. S.Y.S.T.E.M. featuring Michelle Visage	
January 30	"Deeper and Deeper"	Madonna	"Deeper and Deeper"	Madonna	
February 6	"Don't You Want Me"	Felix featuring Jomanda	"Deeper and Deeper"	Madonna	
February 13	"Gonna Get Back to You"	MAW and Co. featuring Xaviera Gold	"Shamrocks and Shenanigans (Boom Shalock Lock Boom)""	House Of Pain	
February 20	"Always"	MK featuring Alana	"Supermodel (You Better Work)"	Rupaul	
February 27	"Mr. Wendal"	Arrested Development	"Supermodel (You Better Work)"	Rupaul	
March 6	"I'm Every Woman"	Whitney Houston	"Rebirth Of Slick (Cool Like Dat)"	Digable Planets	
March 13	"I'm Every Woman"	Whitney Houston	"Hip Hop Hooray"	Naughty By Nature	
March 20	"Love U More"	Sunscreem	"Get Away"	Bobby Brown	
March 27	"Love U More"	Sunscreem	"Informer"	Snow	
April 3	"Give It to You"	Martha Wash	"I'm Every Woman"	Whitney Houston	
April 10	"Little Bird"	Annie Lennox	"I'm Every Woman"	Whitney Houston	
April 17	"Born 2 B.R.E.E.D."	Monie Love	"Give It to You"	Martha Wash	
April 24	"Took My Love"	Bizarre Inc featuring Angie Brown	"Fever" / "Bad Girl"	Madonna	
May 1	"Took My Love"	Bizarre Inc featuring Angie Brown	"Fever" / "Bad Girl"	Madonna	
May 8	"Show Me Love"	Robin S.	"Show Me Love"	Robin S.	
May 15	"Fever"	Madonna	"Show Me Love"	Robin S.	
May 22	"Who Is It"	Michael Jackson	"Who Is It"	Michael Jackson	
May 29	"I Can't Get No Sleep"	Masters at Work featuring India	"Who Is It"	Michael Jackson	
June 5	"Pressure Us"	Sunscreem	"That's the Way Love Goes"	Janet Jackson	
June 12	"Regret"	New Order	"That's the Way Love Goes"	Janet Jackson	
June 19	"Phorever People"	The Shamen	"That's the Way Love Goes"	Janet Jackson	
June 26	"That's the Way Love Goes"	Janet Jackson	"That's the Way Love Goes"	Janet Jackson	
July 3	"Plastic Dreams"	Jaydee	"More And More"	Captain Hollywood Project	
July 10	"Gotta Know (Your Name)"	Malaika	"More And More"	Captain Hollywood Project	
July 17	"U R the Best Thing"	D:Ream	"Back to My Roots"	RuPaul	
July 24	"Back to My Roots"	RuPaul	"Plastic Dreams"	Jaydee	
July 31	"Bad Mood"	Lonnie Gordon	"Dre Day"	Dr. Dre	
August 7	"Shine"	Midi Rain	"Slam"	Onyx	
August 14	"Can You Forgive Her?"	Pet Shop Boys	"Can't Get Enough Of Your Love"	Taylor Dayne	
August 21	"Gimme Luv (Eenie Meenie Miny Mo)"	David Morales and the Bad Yard Club	"If"	Janet Jackson	
August 28	"Gimme Luv (Eenie Meenie Miny Mo)"	David Morales and the Bad Yard Club	"Check Yo Self"	Ice Cube	
September 4	"If"	Janet Jackson	"Hey Mr. DJ"	Zhane	
September 11	"If"	Janet Jackson	"Hey Mr. DJ"	Zhane	
September 18	"Love for Love"	Robin S.	"Breakadawn"	De La Soul	
September 25	"World (The Price of Love)"	New Order	"Breakadawn"	De La Soul	
October 2	"Slide on The Rhythm"	Arizona featuring Zeitia	"Hey Mr. D.J."	Zhane	
October 9	"A Shade Shady (Now Prance)"	RuPaul	"Hey Mr. D.J."	Zhane	
October 16	"Dreamlover"	Mariah Carey	"Hey Mr. D.J."	Zhane	
October 23	"Dreams"	Gabrielle	"Hey Mr. D.J."	Zhane	
October 30	"Move"	Moby	"Gangsta Lean"	DRS	
November 6	"Give It Up"	The Goodmen	"Award Tour"	A Tribe Called Quest	
November 13	"Happenin' All Over Again"	Lonnie Gordon	"Award Tour"	A Tribe Called Quest	
November 20	"House of Love"	Smooth Touch	"Freakit"	Das EFX	
November 27	"Sexdrive"	Grace Jones	"Freakit"	Das EFX	
December 4	"The Program"	David Morales and the Bad Yard Club	"Shoop"	Salt-N-Pepa	
December 11	"Lemon"	U2	"Getto Jam"	Domino	
December 18	"Go West"	Pet Shop Boys	"Getto Jam"	Domino	
December 25	"Tradición"	Gloria Estefan	"Getto Jam"	Domino	

== See also ==
- 1993 in music
- List of Billboard Hot 100 number ones of 1993
