= I Am, I Feel =

1996 single by Alisha's Attic

Single by Alisha's Attic

from the album Alisha Rules the World
- B-side: "Angel Eyes"; "White Room"; "Daffodil or a Diamond"
- Released: 15 July 1996
- Genre: Pop
- Length: 4:00
- Label: Mercury
- Songwriters: Karen Poole; Shelly Poole
- Producer: Dave Stewart

Alisha's Attic singles chronology
| "I Am, I Feel" (1996) | "Alisha Rules the World" (1996) |

"I Am, I Feel" is the debut single by British pop music duo Alisha's Attic, released in July 1996 by Mercury Records from the duo's debut album, Alisha Rules the World (1996). The song was written by sisters Karen and Shelly Poole, and produced by Dave Stewart. It quickly became a radio and chart hit in the UK, peaking at number 14 on the UK Singles Chart. Lyrically, the duo has stated that it is about "a woman rebelling against a man" in a relationship gone bad. "I Am, I Feel" was nominated in the category for Best Song Musically & Lyrically at the 1997 Ivor Novello Awards.

== Chart performance ==
In the duo's native UK, "I Am, I Feel" debuted at number 15 on the UK Singles Chart on 28 July 1996. The song peaked the following week at number 14. It then dropped to number 15 for two weeks, then number 18 for two more weeks, 25 and finally 35, before leaving the UK top 40 in September. In France, it spent one week on the SNEP Singles Chart, entering at number 40 on 11 January 1997. In Sweden, the single spent eight weeks inside Sverigetopplistan, debuting in September 1996 and peaking three weeks later at number 23. Outside Europe, it peaked at number 18 in Australia, with 18 weeks within the ARIA singles chart.

== Critical reception ==
"I Am, I Feel" received positive reviews from music critics. American magazine Billboard described it as a "engaging pop song", noting "the witty, assertive lyrics [that] show a confident act driven by intelligent songwriting capped with exciting vocals". Daina Darzin from Cash Box stated that it "is well on its way to being a hit." She felt the song "is a great example of the more lighthearted end of this British female duo's quirky, funky sound (kinda like a cross between Kate Bush and Prince) which adds a bit of ska beat to a pretty melody and sarcastic lyrics like "I wanna bite his head off/Yeah that'd be fun"."

Caroline Sullivan from The Guardian said in her album review, "Their iron-fist-in-velvet-glove persona is mildly fetching on the kittenish singles 'I Am, I Said' and 'Alisha Rules the World'. A reviewer from Music Week gave it a full score of five out of five and named it Single of the Week, writing, "This brilliant pop song marks the debut of the Dagenham duo of sisters and should launch them as one of the nation's finest pop hopes. Simply irresistible." The Times complimented it as "catchy", stating that it "made you sing it over and over again!" In 2012, the song was named an Official Chart 'Pop Gem'. They noted that to date, it has sold 153,000 copies in the UK.

== Track listing ==
- CD single, France (1996)
1. "I Am, I Feel" — 4:03
2. "Angel Eyes" (Live @ The Corbin Hall) — 1:49
- CD single, UK (1996)
1. "I Am, I Feel" — 4:00
2. "Angel Eyes" (Live @ The Corbin Hall) — 1:46
3. "White Room" (Live @ The Corbin Hall) — 4:00
4. "I Am, I Feel" (Dark Disco Mix) — 8:13
- CD maxi, Japan (1996)
1. "I Am, I Feel" — 4:00
2. "Daffodil or a Diamond" (Live @ The Corbin Hall) — 3:36
3. "I Am, I Feel" (Junior Vasquez Urban Mix) — 5:55
4. "I Am, I Feel" (Junior Vasquez Urban Beats) — 7:46

== Charts ==
=== Weekly charts ===
| Chart (1996–1997) | Peak position |
|---|---|
| Australia (ARIA) | 18 |
| Europe (Eurochart Hot 100) | 27 |
| Europe (Alternative Rock Radio) | 15 |
| Europe (European Hit Radio) | 12 |
| France (SNEP) | 40 |
| France Airplay (SNEP) | 6 |
| Germany (GfK) | 69 |
| Iceland (Íslenski Listinn Topp 40) | 26 |
| Ireland (IRMA) | 13 |
| Israel (Israeli Singles Chart) | 17 |
| Scottish Singles Sales (Official Charts) | 14 |
| Sweden (Sverigetopplistan) | 23 |
| UK Singles (Official Charts) | 14 |
| UK Airplay (Music Week) | 2 |

=== Year-end charts ===
| Chart (1996) | Position |
|---|---|
| UK Singles (OCC) | 89 |
| UK Airplay (Music Week) | 12 |

| Chart (1997) | Position |
|---|---|
| Australia (ARIA) | 88 |

== Certifications ==
| Region | Certification | Certified units/sales |
|---|---|---|
| Australia (ARIA) | Gold | 35,000^{^} |
| United Kingdom (BPI) | Silver | 200,000^{‡} |
^{^} Shipments figures based on certification alone.^{‡} Sales+streaming figures based on certification alone.

== Release history ==
| Region | Date | Format(s) | Label(s) | Ref(s). |
|---|---|---|---|---|
| United Kingdom | 15 July 1996 | CD; cassette | Mercury | |
| Japan | 15 January 1997 | CD | Mercury | |
| United States | 7 April 1997 | Modern rock radio | Mercury | |
| United States | 29 April 1997 | Rhythmic contemporary radio | Mercury | |
| United States | 20 May 1997 | Contemporary hit radio | Mercury | |
