= Borderline (Michael Gray song) =

2006 single by Michael Gray

Single by Michael Gray featuring Shelly Poole
- Released: 7 August 2006
- Length: 7:35 (original mix); 3:15 (radio edit)
- Label: Universal Music TV; Eye Industries
- Songwriters: Shelly Poole; Michael Gray; David Washington
- Producer: Michael Gray

Michael Gray singles chronology
"The Weekend" (2004)	"Borderline" (2006)	"Somewhere Beyond" (2007)

Shelly Poole singles chronology
"Lost in You" (2006)	"Borderline" (2006)	"Totally Underwater" (remix) (2006)

"Borderline" is a song by British producer Michael Gray featuring Shelly Poole of Alisha's Attic. It was released in August 2006 as Gray's second single. While "Borderline" failed to match the success of its predecessor, "The Weekend", it entered the top 50 on various record charts, including those of Australia, Germany, Hungary, Ireland, Italy, and the United Kingdom.

== Content ==
The song contains a sample replay of Chapter 8's 1979 R&B hit "Ready for Your Love".

== Music video ==
The music video does not include Michael Gray or Shelly Poole. It features dancer Keeley Malone lying on a sun chair touching another dancer and lipsynching parts of the song - this scene switches back and forth through others which are of female dancers (including Shelina Gallacher among others) on rooftops of buildings in London (St. Paul's Cathedral can be seen at times in the background, and at least one location is believed to be 8-10 New Fetter Ln, EC4). The outfits in the video consist of what looks like; a white schoolgirl top and black tie, a black coat, a black bikini bottom, black stockings and black heels (as seen in the video screenshot). The video has been banned on 3 UK TV channels as a result. It was directed by Phil Griffin.

== Track listings ==
UK CD single

1. "Borderline" (radio edit) – 3:15
2. "Borderline" (original mix) – 7:35
3. "Borderline" (vocal club mix) – 6:25
4. "Borderline" (Dennis Christopher's Vocal mix) – 7:06
5. "Borderline" (Spencer & Hill mix) – 5:58
6. "Borderline" (video)

UK and US digital download

1. "Borderline" (radio edit) – 3:15
2. "Borderline" (club mix) – 6:09
3. "Borderline" (Disciples of Sound Vocal mix) – 8:28
4. "Borderline" (Disciples of Sound Dub mix) – 8:27
5. "Borderline" (Spencer & Hill mix) – 5:56
6. "Borderline" (Spencer & Hill Dub mix) – 5:57
7. "Borderline" (Michael's Neon Wave Vocal mix) – 7:10
8. "Borderline" (Michael's Neon Wave Dub mix) – 5:54
9. "Borderline" (Dennis Christopher's Vocal mix) – 7:06
10. "Borderline" (Dennis Christopher's Dub mix) – 6:51
11. "Borderline" (Dennis Christopher's Alternative Dub mix) – 7:06

European CD single

1. "Borderline" (radio edit) – 3:15
2. "Borderline" (vocal club mix) – 5:54
3. "Borderline" (Michael Gray's Neon Wave Vocal mix) – 7:10
4. "Borderline" (Lee "Muddy" Baker acoustic mix) – 3:12

Australian CD single

1. "Borderline" (radio edit) – 3:15
2. "Borderline" (Lee "Muddy" Baker acoustic mix) – 3:12
3. "Borderline" (Ian Carey mix) – 6:55
4. "Borderline" (original mix) – 7:20
5. "Borderline" (vocal club mix) – 6:09
6. "Borderline" (Dennis Christopher's Vocal mix) – 7:05
7. "Borderline" (Spencer & Hill mix) – 5:57

Australian and New Zealand digital download

1. "Borderline" (radio edit) – 3:14
2. "Borderline" (Lee "Muddy" Baker acoustic mix) – 3:11
3. "Borderline" (Ian Carey mix) – 6:54
4. "Borderline" – 7:19
5. "Borderline" (vocal club mix) – 6:09
6. "Borderline" (Dennis Christopher's Vocal mix) – 7:05
7. "Borderline" (Spencer & Hill mix) – 5:56
8. "Borderline" (Neon Wave Vocal mix) – 7:14
9. "Borderline" (Disciples of Sound Vocal mix) – 8:32
10. "Borderline" (Gianluca Motto "Soho" mix) – 8:27
11. "Borderline" (Pain & Rossini mix) – 6:40

== Credits and personnel ==
- Producer, mixing, keyboards, programming: Michael Gray
- Vocals: Shelly Poole
- Dancers: Keeley Malone, Katy Evans, Dina Moore
- Sample replay: Mark Summers, Scorccio.com
- Bass: James Winchester
- Photography: Luciana
- Photography, Video Director: Phil Griffin
- Recorded at Sultra Studios UK

== Charts ==
Chart (2006)	Peak position
Australia (ARIA)	49
Austria (Ö3 Austria Top 40)	63
Belgium (Ultratip Bubbling Under Flanders)	2
CIS Airplay (TopHit)	79
Germany (GfK)	42
Hungary (Dance Top 40)	4
Hungary (Single Top 40)	8
Ireland (IRMA)	42
Italy (FIMI)	32
Netherlands (Single Top 100)	78
Russia Airplay (TopHit)	76
Scotland Singles (OCC)	15
Switzerland (Schweizer Hitparade)	75
UK Singles (OCC)	12
UK Dance (OCC)	3
Ukraine Airplay (TopHit)	100
US Dance/Mix Show Airplay (Billboard)	15

== Release history ==
Region	Date	Format(s)	Label(s)	Ref.
United Kingdom	7 August 2006	12-inch vinyl; CD	Universal Music TV; Eye Industries	
Australia	18 September 2006	CD	Liberator Music	
