= Illumina =

Illumina may refer to:

- Illumina (Alisha's Attic album), an album by Alisha's Attic
- Illumina, Inc., a biotechnology company based in San Diego, California, United States
- Illumina (Two Steps from Hell album), an album by Two Steps from Hell
