= Sofia's Choice =

- Ugly Betty episode
- Daniel and Sofia on a morning talk show.
- Episode no.: Season 1 Episode 12
- Directed by: Jim Hayman
- Written by: Silvio Horta
- Production code: 112
- Original air date: January 11, 2007

Guest appearance
- Salma Hayek

Episode chronology
← Previous "Swag"	Next → "In or Out"
- Ugly Betty season 1

"Sofia's Choice" is the twelfth episode from the first season of the dramedy series Ugly Betty, which aired on the ABC network in the United States on January 11, 2007. It was written by Silvio Horta, produced by Salma Hayek and directed by Jim Hayman.

== Plot ==
Betty gets her first assignment from Sofia at MYW. She has to write an article about her experience of being an outsider at MODE, but does not want to. Sofia convinces her of doing it by pretending to get emotional and crying. Betty goes back to MODE to ask Marc, Amanda and Daniel about their first impressions of her and starts writing the article. Meanwhile, Daniel takes Sofia to his father's house to have dinner with his parents. It all seems to be going fine, until both couples begin to dance and Claire, Daniel's alcoholic mother, tells Bradford that she does like Sofia, but she thinks that she is hiding something.

Outside, Betty sees Sofia meet Hunter, her ex-boyfriend who is supposed to be in Europe, to give him money in secret. Betty runs back to MODE to inform Christina. They track down Hunter to a male strip club and talk to him; he reveals that Sofia hired him to pose as her fiancé. Daniel announces that he has proposed to Sofia and Betty cannot bring herself to tell him about the lie. The following day, Betty discovers that Sofia hired Hunter to manipulate Daniel, and that their engagement will be announced on the air that morning. Betty also notices a draft of Sofia's latest article. In it, she recommends several steps to get a proposal in 60 days; she applied them all in her relationship with Daniel.

Sofia and Daniel go live on the air as Betty unsuccessfully attempts to stop them. Sofia talks about her new magazine and how she got Daniel to propose to her in 60 days, making him squirm. Sofia also admits that she is not really in love with Daniel and takes her ring off. Daniel leaves the studio in a state of shock. Betty tries to apologize to Daniel, but he is too stunned to even notice her.

Sofia enters the office to thunderous applause from all except Betty, who hands her the article that she has written about working at MODE and quits MYW. Amanda greets an unsuspecting Sofia as she gets into the elevator to leave for the day. When the doors close, Amanda starts to give Sofia a vicious and brutal beating with her purse as the doors close. Betty then goes to see Daniel at MODE, but Marc quickly informs her that he is missing.

Meanwhile, Wilhelmina and Ted continue to progress with their relationship and she is quickly becoming a happier person. She goes to see the mystery woman and tells her that the attempt to take over MODE may not happen. Ted later meets with his ex-wife and decides to try to work things out with her. He breaks up with Wilhelmina, who accepts that she and him never had a future together and returns to her old attitude. Marc tells her that Steve, the private investigator who was working for Bradford but turned out to be a traitor, called, and she answers his message.

Ignacio and his caseworker, Constance Grady, have a falling-out. He tries to get a new case worker but she returns to his home, furious at him for trying to replace her. Hilda suggests to her father that he should try being nice to her and start by getting her a small gift. Ignacio takes this advice; Constance hugs him ecstatically and tells him that she hopes to be seeing a lot more of him. Ignacio sits stunned on the couch as she leaves.

== Production ==
Although there were rumors circulating at the time that her character would return, this would be Hayek's last appearance in the show. Something similar happened with Becki Newton, who plays in a dual role in this episode. Producer Silbio Horta told TV Guide that Newton would come back in future shows, but this never came to be.

Newton also provided the screaming voice of Marc in the scene in which he sees the armadillo.

A scene featuring Sofia and Amanda fighting in an elevator was deleted from the episode, but was later featured in the first season DVD.

A website mentioned in this episode, DudeCruise.com, redirects to the official Ugly Betty website. This stunt would be reapeated with several other "websites" mentioned throughout the show. DudeCruise.com is referenced again in the episode Secretaries' Day.

In the episode, Sofia mentions that Penélope Cruz wants to play her in a movie version of her book. In real life, Hayek and Cruz are best friends and Cruz has admitted that she would like to guest star on the show one day.

This is the first of very few episodes in which the first act does not end on a close-up of Betty when transitioning to the title sequence. Instead, it ends on a close-up of Sofia.

== Casting ==
Mark Indelicato, although credited, was absent from this episode.

== Music notes ==
In the strip bar scene, the song played in the background is Michael Gray's 2004 Dance hit "The Weekend".

== Ratings ==
The episode was watched by more than 13.5 million viewers in the United States, its third-highest episode ever.

== Awards ==
Alan Dale submitted this episode for consideration in the category of "Outstanding Supporting Actor in a Comedy Series" on his behalf for the 2007 Emmy Awards. He did not end up being nominated.

== Also starring ==
- Judith Light (Claire Meade)
- Salma Hayek (Sofia Reyes)
- Octavia Spencer (Constance Grady)

== Guest stars ==
- Brett Cullen (Ted LeBeau)
- Teddy Sears (Hunter)
- Andi Matheny (Female TV co-host)
- Nolan North (Male TV co-host)
- Lisa K. Wyatt (Woman in wheelchair)
- Kurt David Anderson (Production Assistant)
- Justin Scot (Editorial Assistant)
- Lorin Shapiro (Jersey Bachelorette)
- Blumes Tracy (Male Stripper)
