= Let's Get Down =

Let's Get Down may refer to:

- "Let's Get Down" (Tony! Toni! Toné! song)
- "Let's Get Down" (Bow Wow song)
- "Let's Get Down" (Supafly song)
