= Arachnophobia (disambiguation) =

Arachnophobia is the state of being afraid of spiders. Other uses include:

- Arachnophobia (film), a 1990 American comedy-horror film starring Jeff Daniels
- Arachnophobia (video game)
- Arachnophobiac, an album by Michael Schenker Group, 2003
- Araknofobia, a 1990s electronic music group
