= Alisha Rules the World (song) =

1996 single by Alisha's Attic

Single by Alisha's Attic

from the album Alisha Rules the World
- B-side: "White Room" (live); "Drunken and Tearful"; "God Lives Here"
- Released: 21 October 1996
- Length: 4:32
- Label: Mercury
- Songwriter(s): Karen Poole; Terry Martin; Shelly Poole
- Producer(s): Dave Stewart

Alisha's Attic singles chronology
"I Am, I Feel" (1996)	"Alisha Rules the World" (1996)	"Indestructible" (1997)

Audio
- "Alisha Rules the World" on YouTube

"Alisha Rules the World" is a song by English pop music duo Alisha's Attic. Written by members Karen and Shelly Poole with Terry Martin, the song is about a woman named Alisha whose sweet, outward appearance deceives the people around her, as she actually possesses a devilish personality. Produced by Dave Stewart of Eurythmics, "Alisha Rules the World" was released as the second single from the duo's debut album, Alisha Rules the World (1996), on 21 October 1996. The song became the duo's second top-20 hit in the United Kingdom, peaking at number 12 on the UK singles chart. Worldwide, the single entered the top 40 in Australia, Iceland, and Ireland.

== Lyrical content ==
According to Karen Poole, "Alisha Rules the World" is about a woman named Alisha who appears kind and gentle on the outside, even dressing up in fairy costumes, but she is actually vicious on the inside, with people never knowing if "she's going to beat [them] up or not".

== Critical reception ==
British trade paper Music Week rated the song four out of five, calling it a "slower, slinkier" successor to the previous single, "I Am, I Feel", and noting the "gifted" songwriting of Alisha's Attic.

== Track listings ==
UK CD1

1. "Alisha Rules the World" – 4:32
2. "White Room" (live on Channel 4) – 3:56
3. "Alisha Rules the World" (Sex & Love mix) – 6:31
4. "Drunken and Tearful" – 3:27

UK CD2

1. "Alisha Rules the World" – 4:32
2. "God Lives Here" – 3:00
3. "Alisha Rules the World" (Network Nut dub) – 6:50
4. "Alisha Rules the World" (Mirror Ball mix) – 8:10

UK cassette single

1. "Alisha Rules the World"
2. "Drunken and Tearful"

== Personnel ==
Personnel are taken from the Alisha Rules the World album booklet.

- Karen Poole – writing
- Terry Martin – writing
- Shelly Poole – writing
- Dave Stewart – production
- Nick Addison – engineering
- Ash Howes – mix engineering
- Chris Scard – assistant engineering
- Will Garrett – assistant engineering

== Charts ==
Chart (1996–1997)	Peak position
Australia (ARIA)	26
Europe (Eurochart Hot 100)	34
Germany (GfK)	69
Iceland (Íslenski Listinn Topp 40)	33
Ireland (IRMA)	24
Scotland (OCC)	16
Sweden (Sverigetopplistan)	60
UK Singles (OCC)	12

== Release history ==
Region	Date	Format(s)	Label(s)	Ref.
United Kingdom	21 October 1996	CD; cassette	Mercury	
Japan	25 April 1997	CD	Mercury	
