= Corrado Rizza =

Italian DJ and producer (born 1961)

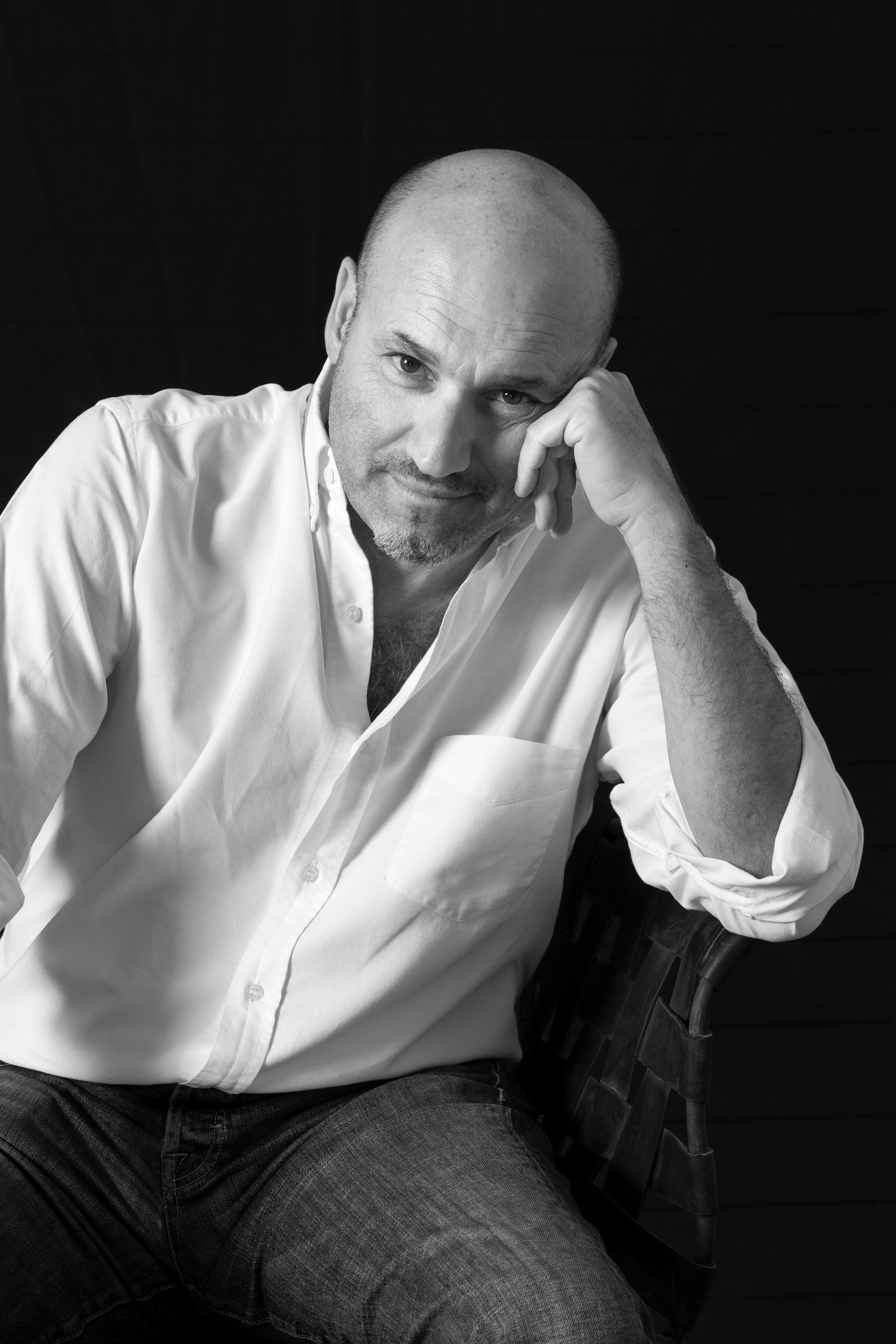

Background information
- Born: 4 August 1961 (age 65); Rome, Italy
- Genre: House
- Label: Lemon Cut
- Website: www.corradorizza.it

Corrado Rizza (born 4 August 1961, Rome, Italy) is an Italian DJ and producer.

== Career ==
Rizza was born in Rome, Italy, and was working as a DJ from the early 80's in some of the main clubs of Rome/Italy and in US: from Histeria and Gilda. in Rome to Lavo in NY and Delano in Miami.

At the end of the 80's he was one of the first Italo house producer with his band the Jam Machine and after he found Livexpress Production with Max and Frank Minoia, he created in 1991 the label Lemon Records with Gino Woody Bianchi and Dom Scuteri and he produced club hits such as "Give me rhythm" by Black Connection, "Satisfy your dream" by Paradise Orchestra, "Nothing has been proved" by Strings Of Love, "Everyday" by Jam Machine, "Tomorrow" by Daybreak feat. Karen Jones, "In the Heat" by Global Mind, etc.

In his career has collaborated as producer and remixer with artists and djs such as: Marshall Jefferson, Arthur Baker, Eric Kupper, Paul Oakenfold, Full Intention, Black Box, Miguel Migs and many more. In 1996 he had a gold record after he mixed with Gino Woody Bianchi the compilation Hit Mania Dance 96 for 70.000 copies sold in Italy.

His productions were included inside important compilations of big djs and labels such as Pete Tong, Tony Humphries, Joey Negro, Judge Jules, Norman Jay, Ministry of Sound, FFRR Records, Renaissance, Cafe' Mambo, etc. He realized as director the documentary: "Beat Parade" (2009) and "Strani Ritmi" (2014). He produced few albums such as: "No Big Deal" by Jive (JVC Records – Japan – 1997), "Harmonoize" by Kitchentools – (Virgin Records – Italy – 2001) and many albums by Jingle Jungle Boyz including inside the compilation Hit Mania Dance, the most famous Italian dance compilation that he coordinated for few years that yearly sold one million of copies for over a decade. He has written also soundtracks: "Verso Sud" by Pasquale Pozzessere and "Anche i Commercialisti hanno un anima" by Maurizio Ponzi and books: "Beatles Dolce Vita", "Piper Generation, "I Love The Nightlife" with the dj Marco Trani and "Anni Vinilici".

In 2019 Corrado Rizza directed and produced a documentary movie called Larry's Garage about the DJ Larry Levan from the Paradise Garage in New York City.

== Selected discography ==
=== Albums ===
- 1997: Jive – No Big Deal, JVC Records (Japan)
- 2001: Kitchentools – Harmonoize, Virgin Records (Italy)
- 2003: Jingle Jungle Boyz – Tribal Mania Vol. 1, with Hit Mania Dance 2004, BMG (Italy)
- 2007: Jingle Jungle Boyz – Tribal Mania Vol. 11, with Hit Mania 2008, Sony (Italy)

=== Singles ===
- 1989: The Jam Machine feat. Melvin Hudson – "Everyday" (Gino Woody Bianchi Club Remix), X-Energy
- 1989: Paradise Orchestra feat. Melvin Hudson – "Satisfy Your Dream" (Gino Woody Bianchi Club Remix), X-Energy
- 1989: The Strings of Love – "Nothing Has Been Proved" (Paul Oakenfold Remix), X-Energy
- 1995: Global Mind featuring Desy Moore – "In the Heat" (Marshall Jefferson Remix) / (Victor Simonelli Club Mix), Lemon Records
- 1997: Black Connection feat. Orlando Johnson – "Give Me Rhythm" (Full Intention Club Mix), Lemon Records
- 2013: Corrado Rizza Presents Global Mind – "In the Heat" (Miguel Migs Remixes), Salted Music
- 2014: Corrado Rizza feat. Desy Moore – "I Can't Fight It" (Eric Kupper Remix), Lemon Cut Records

=== Compilations ===
- 1982: Garage – The Sound of the Underground (mixed by Gino Woody Bianchi and Corrado Rizza), X-Energy/RCA
- 1995: Hit Parade Dance Champions '95–'96 (mixed by Gino Woody Bianchi and Corrado Rizza), Flying Records
- 1995: Hit Mania Dance 1996 (mixed by Gino Woody Bianchi and Corrado Rizza), Flying Records
- 1995: Dance Revival Vol. 1 (mixed by Gino Woody Bianchi and Corrado Rizza), Lemon Records
- 2007: Chi siamo noi – Gli inediti di Viva Radio 2 (Fiorello and Baldini), Sony

=== Remixes ===
- 1991: Shannon – "Let the Music Play" (remix by Gino Woody Bianchi, Corrado Rizza and Dom Scuteri), Flying Records
- 1992: Dr. Felix – "Baby Takes 2" (remix by Corrado Rizza and Gino "Woody" Bianchi), EMI
- 1996: Arthur Baker presents Wally Jump Jr. – "Turn Me Loose Turn Me Loose" (remix by Gino Woody Bianchi, Corrado Rizza and Dom Scuteri), Lemon Records

== Filmography ==
- Roma Caput Disco – film documentary – filmmaker
- Piper Generation – film documentary – filmmaker

== Books ==
- Cristiano Colaizzi e Corrado Rizza - Disco Playlist Italia 1975-1995 - Vololibero, 2026, ISBN 9788832085600

== Bibliography ==
- Betts, Graham (2005). Complete UK Hit Singles 1952-2005. London: Collins. ISBN 00-0720-532-5.
- Carpenter, Chiara (2015). Nightswimming: Discotheques from the 1960s to the Present. London: Bedford Press. ISBN 978-19-0741-449-7.
- Cecchetto, Claudio (2014). In diretta. Il Gioca Jouer della mia vita. Milan: Baldini&Castoldi. ISBN 978-88-6852-726-6.
- Larkin, Colin (1998). The Virgin Encyclopedia Of Dance Music. London: Virgin. ISBN 07-5350-252-6.
- Locati Luciani, Luca (2013). Crisco Disco - Disco Music & Clubbing gay tra gli anni 70 e 80. Milan: Vololibero. ISBN 978-88-97637-09-7.
- Sada, Riccardo (2017). EDM E Dio Mixa. Milan: Nobook. ISBN 978-88-9859-120-6.
- Whitburn, Joel (2004). Billboard's Hot Dance/disco 1974-2003. Menomonee, Falls Wisconsin: Billboard. ISBN 08-9820-156-X.
- Zanello, Tommaso "Piotta" (2006). Pioggia che cade, vita che scorre. Tommaso "Piotta" Zanello racconta Lorenzo "Jovanotti" Cherubini. Rome: Arcana. ISBN 88-7966-423-9.
