= Arizona (British band) =

Eurodance project

Arizona was a Eurodance project from England that consisted of remixer/producers Michael Gray and Jon Pearn (both of Full Intention) and vocalist Zeeteah Massiah (born 24 December 1956 in Barbados).

== Biography ==
Their 1993 club music release "Slide on the Rhythm" (credited to Arizona featuring Zeitia) went to #1 on Billboard 's Hot Dance Music/Club Play chart. In March 1994, "I Specialize in Love" was released and reached #74 in the UK Singles Chart.

They are not to be confused with another funk and soul band of the same name, who recorded an eponymous album for RCA in 1977.

== See also ==
- List of Number 1 Dance Hits (United States)
- List of artists who reached number one on the US Dance chart
