= Slide on the Rhythm =

"Slide on The Rhythm"

Single by Arizona featuring Zeitia
- Released: 1993
- Recorded: 1993
- Genre: Electronica/House/Eurodance
- Length: 3:22
- Label: Union City; Virgin Records America
- Songwriter(s): Nick Braddy; Richard Bassof; Michael Gray; Jon Pearn
- Producer(s): Greed

Arizona featuring Zeitia singles chronology
"Slide on The Rhythm" (1993)	"I Specialize In Love" (1994)

"Slide on The Rhythm" is a 1993 Eurodance House song recorded by the British music project Arizona, featuring Bajan-born singer Zeeteah Massiah (credited as "Zeitia" on the song), which was written and produced by Michael Gray and Jon Pearn (under the production name Greed, which later became Full Intention). The single reached number one on Billboard 's Hot Dance Music/Club Play chart on October 2, 1993. The track sampled portions of a 1982 Club song, "Ride on The Rhythm," by the American group Mahogany, which was written and produced by Nick Braddy and Richard Bassof (for whom they get credits for on the American release of "Slide on The Rhythm"). The latter was also one of the earliest production works for Nick Martinelli.

== Track listings ==
12 inch (US)

- A1 Slide On The Rhythm (Funky Mix) 6:06
- A2 Slide On The Rhythm (Dub On The Rhythm Mix) 6:01
- B1 Slide On The Rhythm (D&D Reconstruction Mix) 6:42
- B2 Slide On The Rhythm (Chant On The Rhythm Mix) 5:32

CD Maxi (UK)

- 1 Slide On The Rhythm (7" Edit) 3:28
- 2 Slide On The Rhythm 6:15
- 3 Slide On The Rhythm (Dub On The Rhythm Mix) 6:03
- 4 Slide On The Rhythm (Chant On The Rhythm Mix) 5:32
- 5 Slide On The Rhythm (Funky Mix) 6:00
