= Lost in You =

Lost in You may refer to:

- "Lost in You" (Three Days Grace song)
- "Lost in You" (Chris Gaines song)
- "Lost in You" (Shelly Poole song)
- "Lost in You" (Rod Stewart song)
- "Lost In You" (Lena Meyer-Landrut song)
- "Lost in You" (Ash song)
- "Lost in You", a song by Westlife from Turnaround
