= Rollergirl =

German singer

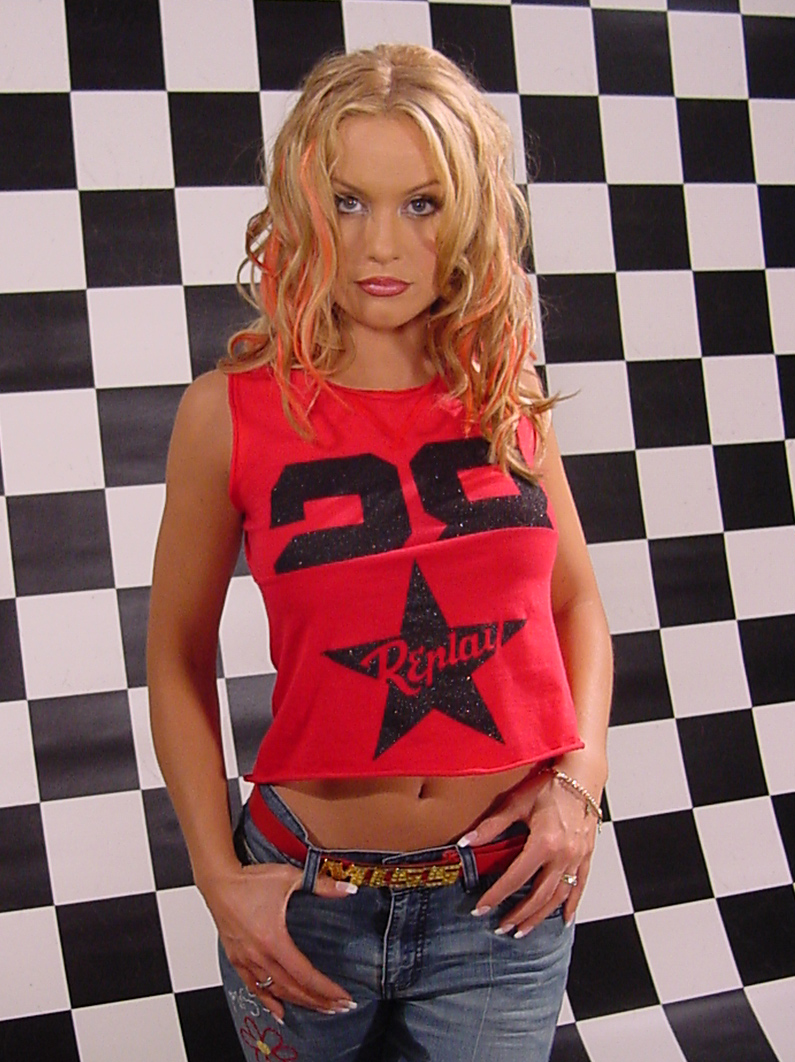
- Rollergirl in 2001

Background information
- Born: Nicole Safft; 19 November 1975 (age 50); Lünen, West Germany
- Genres: Eurodance
- Occupation: Singer
- Years active: 1999–2003
- Label: Universal Music Group
- Spouse: Alex Christensen

Nicole Safft (born 19 November 1975), known professionally as Rollergirl, is a German singer with a number of successful tracks such as "Dear Jessie" (a loose cover of the Madonna song) and "Luv U More", a cover of the Sunscreem song.

== Biography ==
The love for rollerskates developed early when working at a rollerskating rink. Safft was discovered by German producer Alex Christensen on Mallorca and signed up for auditions. In 1999, Christensen produced the song "Dear Jessie" for Rollergirl, which was successful as the opening song at a techno-parade in the United Kingdom, where Safft continued to work using the stage name, 'Nicci Juice'. The pseudonym Rollergirl was taken from Heather Graham's role as a naive young porn starlet in the film Boogie Nights.

"Geisha Dreams" (2002) was Rollergirl's last release before she retired to focus on her private life, including Christensen and their son, born in 2003. Safft has also appeared with Daniel Hartwig as co-presenter of the German television channel RTL 2's The Dome and Megaman 2002.

Rollergirl "Geisha Dreams (Extended Mix) (2002)
27 second sample from Geisha Dreams.

== Personal life ==
Safft is married to Alex Christensen. Their son is professional golfer Tiger Christensen.

== Discography ==
=== Albums ===
List of albums, with selected chart positions
Title	Album details	Peak chart positions	
Title	Album details	| GER	SWE
Now I'm Singin'... And the Party Keeps On Rollin'	Released: 1999; Format: CD; Label: Iceberg, Universal	91	19

=== Singles ===
Year	Single	Peak chart positions								Album
Year	Single	GER	AUT	FRA	NED	NOR	SWE	SWI	UK	Album
1999	"Dear Jessie"	13	—	43	11	10	25	—	22	Now I'm Singin'... And the Party Keeps On Rollin'
1999	"Love U More"	19	—	—	21	19	51	75	—	Now I'm Singin'... And the Party Keeps On Rollin'
2000	"Eternal Flame"	40	—	—	—	—	—	87	—	Now I'm Singin'... And the Party Keeps On Rollin' (re-issue)
2000	"You Make Me Feel Like Dancing"	—	—	—	—	—	—	—	—	Now I'm Singin'... And the Party Keeps On Rollin' (re-issue)
2001	"Superstar"	37	27	—	—	—	6	—	197	Now I'm Singin'... And the Party Keeps On Rollin' (re-issue)
2001	"Close to You"	70	—	—	—	—	53	—	—	Singles only
2002	"Geisha Dreams"	35	24	—	—	—	13	—	—	Singles only
2003	"In the Name of Love"	—	—	—	—	—	—	—	—	Singles only
2003	"Beautiful Day"	—	—	—	—	—	—	—	—	Singles only
"—" denotes releases that did not chart.
