= Broken English (song) =

Single by Marianne Faithfull

from the album Broken English
- B-side: "Why'd Ya Do It"
- Released: 25 January 1980
- Recorded: May–July 1979; Matrix Studios, London
- Genre: Rock; new wave; dance-punk; electronic
- Length: 4:35
- Label: Island
- Songwriters: Marianne Faithfull; Barry Reynolds; Joe Mavety; Steve York; Terry Stannard
- Producer: Mark Miller Mundy

Marianne Faithfull singles chronology
| "The Ballad of Lucy Jordan" (1979) | "Broken English" (1980) | "Sweetheart" (1981) |

"Broken English" is a song recorded by English singer Marianne Faithfull for her seventh studio album Broken English (1979). It was released as the second single from the album on 25 January 1980 by Island Records. Written by Faithfull, Barry Reynolds, Joe Mavety, Steve York and Terry Stannard, the song's lyrical theme revolves around terrorism. The inspiration behind the song was Ulrike Meinhof, a co-founder of the terrorist group Baader-Meinhof Gang. Faithfull allegedly got the idea for the song after watching a documentary about the group and was intrigued by its subtitle "broken English... spoken English".

"Broken English" received positive reviews from music critics, who praised Faithfull's new musical direction and the political theme of the song. Despite the positive reception, it failed to chart in either the United Kingdom or the United States. It managed to peak in the top forty in other countries, such as Germany, New Zealand and Sweden.

== Music ==
"Broken English"

"Broken English" is a mid-tempo rock song with a strong influence from new wave. The song is set in the simple time signature of 4/4, with a tempo of 122 beats per minute. It is built around a simple rhythm guitar motif and synthesizer effects. Faithfull's vocals sound lower and cracked compared to her earlier work due to severe laryngitis coupled with heavy smoking and drug abuse during the 1970s.

No accompanying music video was made for "Broken English", however the song was used along with "Witches' Song" and "The Ballad of Lucy Jordan" in a short promotional film for the album directed by Derek Jarman.

== Critical reception ==
"Broken English" received positive reviews from music critics. Dave Thompson from AllMusic praised Faithfull's vocals but criticized the electronic production of the song. Pitchfork included the song on their "The 200 Best Songs of the 1970s" list at #200, calling it a "prophetic merging of punk and dance, with lyrics that plumb the depths of her losses" with "a bloodless snarl that would make Johnny Rotten flinch.".

== Live performances ==
Faithfull performed the song on Saturday Night Live in February 1980. During the performance her voice cracked and she seemed to strain to even vocalize at times.

== Track listings and formats ==
UK 12" vinyl

- A. "Broken English" (Long Version) – 5:54
- B. "Why'd Ya Do It" – 6:35

UK 7" vinyl

- A. "Broken English"
- B. "What's the Hurry"

US 7" vinyl

- A. "Broken English" (Edit) – 3:00
- B. "Brain Drain" – 4:12

European 12" vinyl (1982 re-release)

- A. "Broken English" (Long Version)
- B. "Sister Morphine"

== Credits and personnel ==
- Marianne Faithfull – lead vocals, songwriting
- Mark Miller Mundy – producer,
- Barry Reynolds – songwriting
- Joe Mavety – songwriting
- Steve York – songwriting
- Terry Stannard – songwriting
- Bob Potter – engineer
- Ed Thacker – mixer

Credits adapted from the album liner notes.

== Charts ==
| Chart (1980) | Peak position |
|---|---|
| New Zealand (Recorded Music NZ) | 25 |
| Sweden (Sverigetopplistan) | 17 |
| West Germany (GfK) | 36 |
| US Dance Club Songs (Billboard) | 59 |
| Australia (Kent Music Report) | 75 |

== Cover versions ==
Co-writer Barry Reynolds released his own version of the song on his 1982 solo album I Scare Myself. A version by English dance music group Sunscreem was released in late 1992 and reached No. 13 on the UK Singles Chart in January 1993, from their debut album O_{3}. The song was also covered by the industrial band Schaft on the album Switchblade. This version would be used as an insert song for Hellsing Ultimate's trailer at Anime Expo 2005 and then used in the actual series for the 5th episode. The song was featured in the film The Outsider (1980).

It has also been covered by Winston Tong and The Mars Volta.
