= Karen Poole =

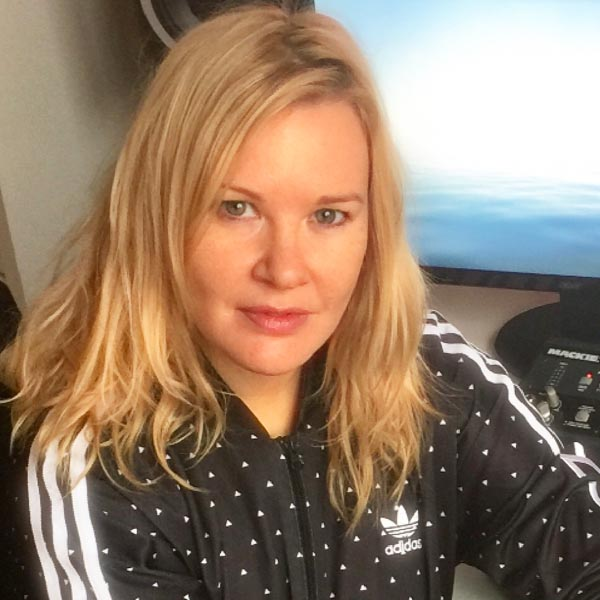
- Poole in 2017
- Born: Karen Ann Poole; 8 January 1971 (age 55); Chadwell Heath, London, England
- Occupations: Singer; songwriter
- Father: Brian Poole
- Relatives: Shelly Poole (sister)
- Musical career
- Genres: Pop; drum and bass; EDM; dance-pop; R&B; house; UK funky; electro
- Years active: 1996–present
- Labels: Universal Music, Mercury Records
- Formerly of: Alisha's Attic
- Website: karenpoole.co.uk

Karen Ann Poole (born 8 January 1971) is an English songwriter and singer based in London. She is best known for her extensive songwriting collaborations with musicians such as Kylie Minogue, Becky Hill, David Guetta, Lily Allen, Sugababes, Zara Larsson, Tiesto, Alesso, Sonny Fodera, Chase & Status, Rita Ora, Fatboy Slim, Sub Focus, Katy B, and many more.

== Career ==
Karen Poole was born in Chadwell Heath, London, and is the daughter of Brian Poole, lead vocalist of the 1960s band The Tremeloes. Karen, along with her sister Shelly Poole, was a founding member of the pop duo Alisha's Attic. The group gained significant success in the 1990s and early 2000s, particularly in the United Kingdom and Europe. The duo produced three albums, including the platinum-selling Alisha Rules the World.

Poole has since enjoyed a successful career as a songwriter. Her contributions span a variety of genres and, as well as the numerous hits in the UK and Europe, also include work with international acts including NCT, Wayv, Red Velvet, EXO, and Twice. Additionally, she co-wrote music for the musical adaptation of Bridget Jones' Diary in 2015, collaborating with Lily Allen and Greg Kurstin.

== Achievements ==
Ivor Novello and twice Brit Awards nominated Poole has achieved more than 35 Top 20 UK hit singles as a songwriter.

In 2021, Karen Poole was honoured with the Best Music Creative Award at the Music Week Women in Music Awards.

== Discography (selected) ==
Year	Artist	Song
2025	Louise	"Borderline"
2025	Louise	"It Ain't Love"
2024	Becky Hill / Chase and Status	"Disconnect"
2024	Becky Hill, MK	"Swim"
2024	Becky Hill, Lewis Thompson	"Side Effects"
2024	Becky Hill	"Back Around"
2024	Becky Hill	"Man of My Dreams"
2024	Nathan Dawe	"We Ain't Here for Long"
2024	NCT Wish	"Steady"
2024	Aespa	"Liquorice"
2024	Sub Focus x Katy B	"Push The Tempo"
2024	Alle Färben x Lewis Thompson	"Love Hurt Repeat"
2023	Caity Baser	"Why Can't I Have Two"
2023	Rita Ora feat. Fatboy Slim	"Praising You"
2023	WayV	"Phantom"
2023	Becky Hill, Sonny Fodera	"Never Be Alone"
2023	Mae Muller	"I Wrote a Song"
2023	Martin Jensen, MATTN	"Still Got It Bad"
2023	Sigala, Dopamine	"Feel It Deep Inside"
2022	Alesso, Zara Larsson	"Words"
2022	Becky Hill, Joel Corry	"HISTORY"
2022	NCT	"To My First"
2022	Red Velvet	"Zoom"
2021	Becky Hill, David Guetta	"Remember"
2021	Changmin	"Human"
2021	TWICE	"F.I.L.A. (Fall in Love Again)"
2021	TWICE	"Promise"
2021	TWICE	"Baby Blue Love"
2020	NCT	"Raise The Roof"
2020	NCT	"Resonance"
2020	NCT	"Make A Wish (Birthday Song) - English Version"
2020	NCT	"Make A Wish (Birthday Song)"
2020	NCT	"MY FACE"
2020	Tiesto & Becky Hill	“Nothing Really Matters"
2019	Becky Hill	"Changing"
2019	Bvndit	"Dumb"
2019	Kylie Minogue	"New York City"
2019	Exo	"Trouble"
2019	Verivery	"Get Outta My Way"
2019	Ha Sung-woon	"Get Ready"
2018	BoA	"I Want You Back"
2018	Dave Winnel, Feenixpawl	"Find A Way"
2018	Don Diablo, Paije	"People Say"
2018	Jacob Plant, Becky Hill	"Only Love"
2018	KT Tunstall	"In This Body"
2018	Kim Dong-han	"Tipsy"
2018	Seulgi, SinB, Chungha, Soyeon	"Wow Thing"
2018	Taeyeon	"Baram x3"
2017	Becky Hill	"Unpredictable"
2017	Galantis	"Rich Boy"
2017	Purple Disco Machine, Boris Dlugosch, Karen Harding	"Love for Days"
2017	Felon, Hayley May	"Bittersweet"
2016	Netsky, Paije	"Who Knows"
2015	Aston Merrygold	"Get Stupid"
2015	Becky Hill, Tai, Watermät	"All My Love"
2015	Gabrielle Aplin	"Hurt"
2015	Giorgio Moroder, Karen Harding	"Good for Me"
2015	Giorgio Moroder, Kylie Minogue	"Right Here, Right Now"
2015	Kylie Minogue	"Christmas Isn't Christmas 'Til You Get Here"
2015	Kylie Minogue	"Cried out Christmas"
2015	Kylie Minogue	"White December"
2015	Say Lou Lou	"Nothing But a Heartbeat"
2014	Eelke Kleijn	"Mistakes I've Made"
2014	Eylar Fox	"A Billion Girls"
2014	Kylie Minogue	"Fine"
2014	Kylie Minogue	"Sparks"
2014	Lily Allen	"As Long as I Got You"
2014	Lily Allen	"Life for Me"
2014	Lily Allen	"Take My Place"
2014	Shift K3Y	"Touch"
2013	Namie Amuro	"Stardust in My Eyes"
2013	Nina Nesbitt	"Mr C"
2013	The Overtones	"All About You"
2013	The Overtones	"Superstar"
2013	Moko	"Your Love"
2013	Union J	"Amaze Me"
2012	Avicii	"Last Dance"
2012	BoA	"The Top"
2012	f(x)	"Love Hate"
2012	Kylie Minogue	"Timebomb"
2011	Christophe Willem	"Ennemis In L.O.V.E."
2011	Christophe Willem, Cliff Masterson	"Si mes larmes tombent"
2011	Olly Murs	"Just Smile"
2010	Boyzone	"Stronger"
2010	Sub Focus, Eliot Sumner	"Splash"
2009	Annie	"I Don't Like Your Band"
2009	Girls' Generation	"Chocolate Love"
2009	Leon Jean-Marie	"Jumpin' Off the Block"
2009	Natalie Bassingthwaighte	"Superhuman"
2009	William Orbit	"Optical Illusions"
2008	Jessica Mauboy	"Let Me Be Me"
2008	Kylie Minogue	"Carried Away"
2008	Kylie Minogue	"Do It Again"
2008	Leon Jean-Marie	"East End Blues"
2008	Will Young	"Are You Happy"
2008	Will Young	"Disconnected"
2008	Will Young	"If Love Equals Nothing"
2008	Will Young	"Let It Go"
2008	Will Young	"Love"
2008	Will Young	"Simple Philosophy"
2008	Will Young	"Won't Look Down"
2008	Sugababes	"Sound of Goodbye"
2008	Sugababes	"Sunday Rain"
2007	Amy Pearson	"Fool"
2007	David Guetta, Chris Willis, Tocadisco	"Tomorrow Can Wait"
2007	Daytona, Nina Sky	"Get Your Clothes Off"
2007	Groove Armada, Mutya Buena	"Song 4 Mutya (Out of Control)"
2007	Kylie Minogue	"Heart Beat Rock"
2007	Kylie Minogue	"King or Queen"
2007	Kylie Minogue	"No More Rain"
2007	Kylie Minogue	"Nu-di-ty"
2007	Kylie Minogue	"Wow"
2007	Peter Grant	"You're Worth It"
2007	Sugababes	"3 Spoons of Suga"
2007	Sugababes	"Mended by You"
2006	Angelis	"Even Though You've Gone"
2006	Jamelia	"Beware of the Dog"
2006	Jamelia	"Know My Name"
2006	Lily Allen	"Cheryl Tweedy"
2006	Sugababes	"Follow Me Home"
2006	William Orbit feat. Sugababes and Kenna	"Spiral"
2005	Rachel Stevens	"Secret Garden"
2005	Will Young	"Keep On"
2005	Will Young	"Think It Over"
2004	Dannii Minogue	"For the Record"
2004	Janet Jackson	"Put Your Hands On"
2004	Kylie Minogue	"Almost a Lover"
2004	Kylie Minogue	"City Games"
2004	The Shapeshifters	"Lola's Theme"
2003	Dannii Minogue	"Creep"
2003	Dannii Minogue	"Put the Needle on It"
2003	Girls Aloud	"On a Round"
2003	Kylie Minogue	"Chocolate"
2003	Kylie Minogue	"Cruise Control"
2003	Kylie Minogue	"Red Blooded Woman"
2003	Kylie Minogue	"Sweet Music"
2003	Lene Nystrøm	"Bad Coffee Day"
2003	Lene Nystrøm	"It's Your Duty"
2003	Lene Nystrøm	"Play with Me"
2003	Rachel Stevens	"Fools"
2003	Sugababes	"Buster"
2003	Sugababes	"Caught in a Moment"
2003	Sugababes	"Conversation's Over"
2003	Will Young	"Ain't Such A Bad Place To Be"
2003	Will Young	"Home"
2003	Will Young	"Stronger"
2003	Will Young	"Switch It On"
2003	Will Young	"Think It Over"
2003	Jamelia	"Taxi"
2002	Amy Studt	"Ladder in My Tights"
2002	Amy Studt	"Misfit"
2002	Amy Studt	"Under the Thumb"
2002	Holly Valance	"Whoop"
2001	So Solid Crew	"Oh No (Sentimental Things)"
2001	Alisha's Attic	"Pretender Got My Heart"
2001	Alisha's Attic	"Push It All Aside"
1998	Alisha's Attic	"The Incidentals"
1997	Alisha's Attic	"Air We Breathe"
1996	Alisha's Attic	"Alisha Rules the World"
1996	Alisha's Attic	"I Am, I Feel"
