= Paradise Orchestra =

- Also known as: Black Connection, Jungle Jive
- Origin: Rome, Italy
- Genres: Italo house
- Years active: 1989-1992

Paradise Orchestra was an Italo house band formed in 1989 in Rome, by Corrado Rizza, Domenico Scuteri and Igino Bianchi. They are mainly remembered for two club hit singles "Satisfy Your Dream", featuring Melvin Hudson, and "Colour Me", featuring Karen Jones.

"Satisfy Your Dream" was included in several remixes and compilations, including The House Sound of Europe – Vol V with the UK label FFRR Records.

"Colour Me", released in 1991, was produced by Corrado Rizza, Gino Woody Bianchi and Dom Scuteri.
