= Pressure (Sunscreem song) =

1991 single by Sunscreem

Single by Sunscreem

from the album O_{3}
- Released: 1991
- Recorded: 1991
- Genre: Techno; house; trance
- Length: 3:49
- Label: Sony Soho Square/Epic
- Songwriters: Lucia Holm; Paul Carnell
- Producers: Lucia Holm; Paul Carnell

Sunscreem singles chronology
"Walk On" (1991)	"Pressure" (1991)	"Love U More" (1992)

Music video
- "Pressure" on YouTube

"Pressure" is a song recorded by British techno group Sunscreem, written and produced by band member Paul Carnell and lead singer Lucia Holm for the act's debut album, O_{3} (1993). Released in 1991 by Sony Soho Square/Epic, it was the group's first single in the United Kingdom, where it peaked at number 60. It became a major club hit in the United States in wake of the success of "Love U More", where it was released as "Pressure US" with a new remixed version and went to number one on the US Billboard Hot Dance Club Play chart for one week in June 1993, their second of three number ones. The re-released version reentered the UK charts afterwards, peaking at number 19 in 1993.

== Critical reception ==
Upon the release of the 1993 re-release, Larry Flick from Billboard magazine wrote, "British rave band aims to build on radio interest generated by the previous 'Love U More' with a tune that blends an anthemic chorus with attitudinal rapping and urgent instrumentation. Cut is an excellent showcase for front woman Lucia Holm's unusual voice and videogenic charm. Already packing dance floors, track is a natural for crossover and top 40 radio. A gem from the potent O_{3} album." In his weekly UK chart commentary, James Masterton described it as "a mellow kind of trance-dance track, for want of a better categorisation and being yet another single off an album that appeals only to specific fans it is unlikely to progress further."

Andy Beevers from Music Week gave the re-release a score of four out of five and named it Pick of the Week in the category of Dance. He stated that it should make it four hits in a row for the Essex outfit. Sherman at the Control from NME viewed the first release as "a pumping number that will be leaning heavily on the door of the charts. Pianos a-plenty, some dreamy yet ferocious vocals from Lucia Holms and a thundering House tune rumbling along underneath." Miranda Sawyer from Select wrote that it "shows off Sunscreem's knack of marrying a pop tune with starry-eyed rave music, like Madonna in a Blake's Seven space suit." Tom Doyle from Smash Hits gave the 1993 version three out of five, naming it "fine trance-dancing rave stuff", with "a big poppy chorus and an angst-ridden lyric all about being "under pressure" and so forth."

== Music video ==
The accompanying music video for "Pressure" was directed by British director, DJ and musician Don Letts and shot in a Battersea studio in London with a host of extras. The set is built around four "walls" attached to rollers which close in on the band. The video was produced by Nick Verden for Shoot Out Films and released on 8 March 1993.

== Track listing ==
- "Pressure" (Original)
1. "Pressure" – 3:52
2. "Pressure" (Release Me Extended) – 6:14
3. "Pressure" (12 Inch Mix) – 5:09
- "Pressure US" (US CD maxi)
1. "Pressure US" (Fire Island Mix) – 8:27
2. "Pressure US" (SXS, remixed by The Wizard Of Oz) – 8:18
3. "Pressure US" (Junior Dub) – 6:39
4. "Pressure US" (Heaven Mix) – 5:01
5. "Pressure US" (Release Me) – 6:13

== Charts ==
=== Weekly charts ===
Weekly chart performance for "Pressure"
Chart (1991–1993)	Peak position
Australia (ARIA)	64
Canada Dance/Urban (RPM)	5
Europe (Eurochart Hot 100)	59
Europe (European Dance Radio)	10
Israel (Israeli Singles Chart)	13
UK Singles (OCC)	19
UK Airplay (Music Week)	15
UK Dance (Music Week)	26
UK Club Chart (Music Week)	1
US Hot Dance Club Play (Billboard)	1
US Maxi-Singles Sales (Billboard)	28

=== Year-end chart ===
Year-end chart performance for "Pressure"
Chart (1993)	Position
Canada Dance/Urban (RPM)	46
UK Club Chart (Music Week)	28

== See also ==
- List of number-one dance singles of 1993 (U.S.)
