= Moving Too Fast =

Single by Supafly Inc.
- Released: 4 September 2006
- Genre: House
- Length: 3:02
- Label: Universal Music
- Songwriters: Phil Collins; Panos Liassi; Andrew Tumi; Christos Papathanasiou; Mark Edwards

Supafly singles chronology
"Let's Get Down" (2005)	"Moving Too Fast" (2006)	"Sunrise" (2007)

"Moving Too Fast" is a song by British electronic duo Supafly Inc. It was released in September 2006 as a single and reached the top 30 in the UK.

The song heavily samples "Another Day in Paradise" by Phil Collins. In the music video, the band is seen dancing around the pool with other people.

== Charts ==
=== Weekly charts ===
Weekly chart performance for "Moving Too Fast"
Chart (2006–2007)	Peak position
Australia (ARIA)	72
Belgium (Ultratop 50 Flanders)	28
CIS Airplay (TopHit)	8
Czech Republic Airplay (ČNS IFPI)	17
Finland (Suomen virallinen lista)	8
Hungary (Dance Top 40)	35
Hungary (Editors' Choice Top 40)	29
Netherlands (Dutch Top 40)	20
Netherlands (Single Top 100)	48
Russia Airplay (TopHit)	8
Scotland Singles (OCC)	26
UK Dance (OCC)	5
UK Singles (OCC)	23

=== Year-end charts ===
Year-end chart performance for "Moving Too Fast"
Chart	Position
CIS (Tophit, 2006)	103
CIS (Tophit, 2007)	164
Netherlands (Dutch Top 40, 2006)	177
Russia Airplay (TopHit, 2006)	127
