= Love U More =

Single by Sunscreem

from the album O_{3}
- Released: 6 July 1992
- Length: 4:11
- Label: Sony Soho Square (UK); Columbia (North America)
- Songwriters: Lucia Holm; Paul Carnell
- Producer: Sunscreem

Sunscreem singles chronology
"Pressure" (1991)	"Love U More" (1992)	"Perfect Motion" (1992)

Music video
- "Love U More" on YouTube

"Love U More" is a song by British techno group Sunscreem, released as a single in July 1992 by Sony Soho Square. It was written by band members Paul Carnell and lead singer Lucia Holm. The single is a track off the group's 1993 album O_{3} and was one of the first techno songs to make the American top 40, where it peaked at No. 36. "Love U More" reached No. 23 in the United Kingdom in July 1992 and went to number one on the American dance chart for two weeks in March 1993, making it their first of three number-one hits there.

== Critical reception ==
Steven McDonald of AllMusic named the song one of the highlights of the O_{3} album. Larry Flick from Billboard magazine wrote, "Quintet has been on the lips of club folks in-the-know for nearly a year now via a pair of invigorating import singles. This cut has already stormed to the top of dance charts worldwide, and is poised for similar success here." He also complimented "the considerable (and unusual) vocal charm" of lead singer Lucia Holm. Dave Sholin from the Gavin Report noted that here, "High energy meets an appealing array of musical styles with the result being a totally fresh production coming off a #1 run in the U.K." A reviewer from Music & Media wrote, "Early '80s electro pop a la Human League comes alive in a new dance jacket. Sequencers follow the rhythms of today's demands, while the melody lingers on."

NME commented, "Bicycling down the summer lanes of pristine rave pop, Sunscreem have come up with a mini-gem here. It's too nice to be true. It's full of fabric conditioner and whiter than white sentiments. And surprisingly, perhaps, for an Essex-born dance crossover whose first allegiance was to the pounding beat, it's a fine choon. The combination of singer Lucia Holm's wholesome tones and just the right amount of cybertronic impetus make for a sparkling interface of benign thrust." Miranda Sawyer from Select wrote, "So 'Love You More', which appears to sing of adoring someone through thick and thin, is in fact about being unable to love someone any more." Charles Aaron of Spin said, "Rather than sampling Kate Bush, this rave "band" hooks up a vocalist who soars to similarly withering heights, but with more grit than ditz. Shades of Rozalla minus the weight of the world."

== Charts ==
=== Weekly charts ===
Chart (1992–1993)	Peak position
Australia (ARIA)	30
Canada Top Singles (RPM)	48
Europe (Eurochart Hot 100)	69
Finland (Suomen virallinen lista)	28
Israel (Israeli Singles Chart)	14
UK Singles (Official Charts)	23
UK Airplay (Music Week)	31
UK Dance (Music Week)	1
UK Club Chart (Music Week)	1
US Billboard Hot 100	36
US Alternative Airplay (Billboard)	3
US Dance Club Songs (Billboard)	1
US Mainstream Top 40 (Billboard)	16
US Maxi-Singles Sales (Billboard)	12
US Cash Box Top 100	26

=== Year-end charts ===
Chart (1992)	Position
UK Club Chart (Music Week)	26

== Cover versions ==
In 1995, DJ Paul Elstak released his version of "Luv U More" which reached number two on the Dutch Single Top 100. In 1999, German singer Rollergirl's version reached the top 20 in Germany, the Netherlands and Norway, number 51 in Sweden and number 75 in Switzerland. The cover was number 87 on the 2000 year-end Music & Media's Border Breakers, a European chart for airplay within the continent but outside each artist's nation of signing their label contract. The song was also covered by Steps on their debut album Step One. Some of the more sexually explicit lyrics of the original were removed from the Steps version. In 2025, Scooter released a cover version together with Paul Elstak and Joost.

== See also ==
- List of number-one dance singles of 1993 (U.S.)
