= O3 (album) =

O_{3}

Studio album by Sunscreem
- Released: 1993
- Labels: Sony Soho Square; Columbia
- Producers: Sunscreem; Mick Shiner; Dave Valentine; Ralph Jezzard

Sunscreem chronology
O_{3} (1993)	Change or Die (1996)

O_{3} is the debut studio album by the English techno/house music band Sunscreem, released in 1993 by Sony Soho Square and Columbia Records. It includes four singles which charted in the United Kingdom: "Pressure", which originally reached number 60 in the UK singles chart; "Love U More", which reached number 23 (AUS No. 30, US No. 36, US Dance No. 1, CAN No. 48); "Perfect Motion", which reached number 18; and a cover of the 1979 Marianne Faithfull song "Broken English", which reached number 13. A remake of "Pressure", retitled as "Pressure US", was also released as a single, reaching number 19 in the UK singles chart (AUS No. 64, US Dance No. 1).

== Critical reception ==
Professional ratings
Review scores
Source	Rating
AllMusic	4/5 stars

In a review for AllMusic, Steven McDonald said that O_{3} "displays a techno act with something of a heart and focus (plus a real drummer from time to time)." He opined that "While the energy level does get pumped from time to time, the accent is more on solid song design and upfront female vocals that do more than provide just another element of the mixes, putting this firmly into the Deee-Lite camp." McDonald concluded the review by describing the album's highlights as being the singles "Love U More", "Perfect Motion" and "Broken English".

== Track listing ==
All tracks written by Sunscreem, except where noted.

No.	Title	Writer(s)	Length
1.	"Portal"		3:25
2.	"Pressure"		5:16
3.	"'B'"		1:55
4.	"Doved Up"		3:03
5.	"Love U More"		4:11
6.	"Perfect Motion"		4:02
7.	"Chasing Dreams"		4:08
8.	"Your Hands"		4:57
9.	"Idaho"		3:00
10.	"Walk On"		5:08
11.	"Broken English"	Marianne Faithfull; Terry Stannard; Barry Reynolds; Steve York; Joe Mavety	3:34
12.	"Release Me"		4:04
13.	"Psycho"		3:57

== Personnel ==
Adapted from the album's liner notes.

Sunscreem

- Lucia Holm – lead vocals, keyboards
- Paul Carnell – keyboards, backing vocals
- Rob Fricker – bass guitar, backing vocals
- Darren Woodford – guitar
- Sean Wright – drums

...with

- Gary Bailey
- Tony Rush

Technical

- Sunscreem – production (all tracks)
- Mick Shiner – production (tracks 2, 6–8, 13)
- Dave Valentine – production (track 4)
- Ralph Jezzard – production (track 10)
- Phil Bodger – mixing
- Darren Woodford – engineer
- Steve Shin – mastering
- Me Company – design

== Charts ==
Chart performance for O_{3}
Chart (1993)	Peak position
Australian Albums (ARIA)	73
UK Albums (Official Charts)	33
