= Black Connection =

Italo house group

Black Connection is an Italo house group formed by Corrado Rizza, Gino Woody Bianchi and Dom Scuteri.

== Biography ==
The group made three singles that charted in the UK and US. The first single was "Give Me Rhythm", the second "I'm Gonna Get Ya' Baby", both sung by Orlando Johnson and remixed by Full Intention. The third single was "Keep Doin' It", sung by Taka Boom, sister of Chaka Khan with the remix of Stella Browne. The group was the 25th Club Play-Artist of the year for Billboard magazine in 1998. Black Connection was included on compilations by DJs and labels such as Pete Tong, Judge Jules, Ministry of Sound, and Café Mambo.

== Bibliography ==
- Whitburn, Joel (2004). Billboard's Hot Dance/disco 1974-2003. Menomonee Falls, Wisconsin: Billboard. ISBN 08-9820-156-X.
- Betts, Graham (2005). Complete UK Hit Singles 1952-2005. London: Collins. ISBN 00-0720-532-5.
