= Araknofobia =

Electronic music group

- Also known as: Friends of Matthew
- Genres: Electronic
- Years active: 1991-1993, 1995
- Labels: Guerilla, Radikal
- Members: Cino Berigliano; Jon Pearn; Michael Gray; Nick Ratcliffe

Araknofobia were an electronic music group formed by Cino Berigliano, Jon Pearn, Michael Gray and Nick Ratcliffe who scored minor success in the early 1990s. The group also appeared on the gold-selling compilation Don't Techno for an Answer, Vol. 1.

== Singles and EPs ==
- "Arachnophobia (I Want U)" (1991)
- "Out There" (1991)
- "The Calling" (1991)
- Feeling High E.P. (1992)
- "The Calling/Out There" (1993)
- "I'm Here You're Here" (1995)
