= The Jam Machine =

The Jam Machine, also known under the pseudonym The Strings of Love, is an Italo house group created by Corrado Rizza with Max and Frank Minoia. The trio scored a minor UK chart hit in 1989 with the song "Everyday" at No. 68. It was released by the UK label Deconstruction after it was licensed from the Italian label X-Energy.

The song was included on the first Italo house compilation album Italia - Dance Music from Italy which features other Italian artists such as Black Box, Gino Latino, etc.

Under the name the Strings of Love, the trio scored a UK chart hit in 1990 with the song "Nothing Has Been Proved" at No. 59, after it was licensed from the Italian label X-Energy to the UK label A&M. The track was remixed in England by Paul Oakenfold. It is a cover of the Pet Shop Boys-produced song recorded by Dusty Springfield for the soundtrack of the 1989 film Scandal.

== Bibliography ==
- Betts, Graham (2005). Complete UK Hit Singles 1952-2005. London: Collins. ISBN 00-0720-532-5.
