= Dear Jessie (Rollergirl song) =

Single by Rollergirl

from the album Now I'm Singin'... And the Party Keeps On Rollin'
- Released: 26 May 1999
- Length: 4:01
- Label: Universal
- Songwriters: Madonna; Patrick Leonard
- Producer: Alex Christensen

Rollergirl singles chronology
"Dear Jessie" (1999)	"Luv U More" (1999)

"Dear Jessie" is the debut single of German singer Rollergirl. The chorus of the song with the same title by American singer-songwriter Madonna was interpolated in this song. Rollergirl released it as the lead single in May 1999 from her debut album, Now I'm Singin'... And the Party Keeps On Rollin. Produced by Alex Christensen from U96, it reached number two in Denmark and number 10 in Norway.

== Track listing ==
- CD single
1. "Dear Jessie" (radio edit)
2. "Dear Jessie" (Green Court mix)
3. "Dear Jessie" (Digglers Long mix)
4. "To Be an Instrumental"

== Charts ==
=== Weekly charts ===
Weekly chart performance
Chart (1999–2000)	Peak position
Denmark (IFPI)	2
Europe (Eurochart Hot 100)	84
France (SNEP)	43
Germany (GfK)	13
Netherlands (Dutch Top 40)	11
Netherlands (Single Top 100)	14
Norway (VG-lista)	10
Sweden (Sverigetopplistan)	25
UK Singles (OCC)	22
UK Dance (OCC)	27

=== Year-end charts ===
Annual chart rankings
Chart (1999)	Position
Germany (Media Control)	69
Netherlands (Dutch Top 40)	188
Chart (2000)	Position
Netherlands (Dutch Top 40)	65
