= Jon Pearn =

- Genres: House, dance, deep house, UK garage
- Occupations: Record producer, musician, DJ, remixer
- Instruments: Keyboards, synthesizer, music sequencer, samplers, drum machine, turntables
- Years active: 1990–present
- Labels: Defected, Simma Black, Suara, Toolroom, Rebirth, OFF
- Website: http://jonpearn.com/

Jon Pearn is an English house music producer and a member of several successful acts including Araknofobia, Full Intention, Bodyrox, SUB-X and Marvel Riot.

== Biography ==
Pearn, with production partner Nick Bridges formed Bodyrox. Their track "Yeah Yeah" was a hit in 2006 with the help of Luciana. "Yeah Yeah" went on to chart at number 2 in the UK Top 40 and was subsequently nominated for two International Dance Music awards, an MTV video award and the prestigious Ivor Novello awards in 2007.

Working alongside Michael Gray as Full Intention, the duo has produced songs such as "America (I Love America)", "Once in a Lifetime" and "I Can Cast a Spell". Moreover, the duo provided remixes for artists including Jamiroquai, Supafly, Mariah Carey, Masters at Work, Emma Bunton and Ultra Nate. Full Intention were also nominated for a Grammy Award for their remix of "Amazing" by George Michael in 2004.

In the 2010s, Pearn released numerous tracks with Full Intention. In May 2019, he collaborated with PowerDress and Arthur Baker on a track called "Constellations".

== Discography ==
=== Singles ===
- 2003 Jon Pearn & Campbell - Reach (Original Dub)
- 2009 Polluted Mindz Ft Master Shortie - Daydream
- 2010 Paul Harris, Michael Gray & Jon Pearn - Caught Up (Original Mix)
- 2012 Michael Gray & Jon Pearn - Jupiter One (Original Mix)
- 2013 Michael Gray & Jon Pearn - Specialized (Original Mix)
- 2019 PowerDress x Arthur Baker & Jon Pearn - Constellations
- 2021 PowerDress & Jon Pearn - Divine Nature
- 2023 PowerDress & Jon Pearn feat Penny F - The Way We Move (Radio Edit)

=== Remixes ===
- 2006 D. Ramirez - Yeah Yeah (Jon Pearn Remix)
- 2016 StoneBridge - Freak On (Jon Pearn Club Mix)
