= Shelly Poole =

Musical artist (born 1972)

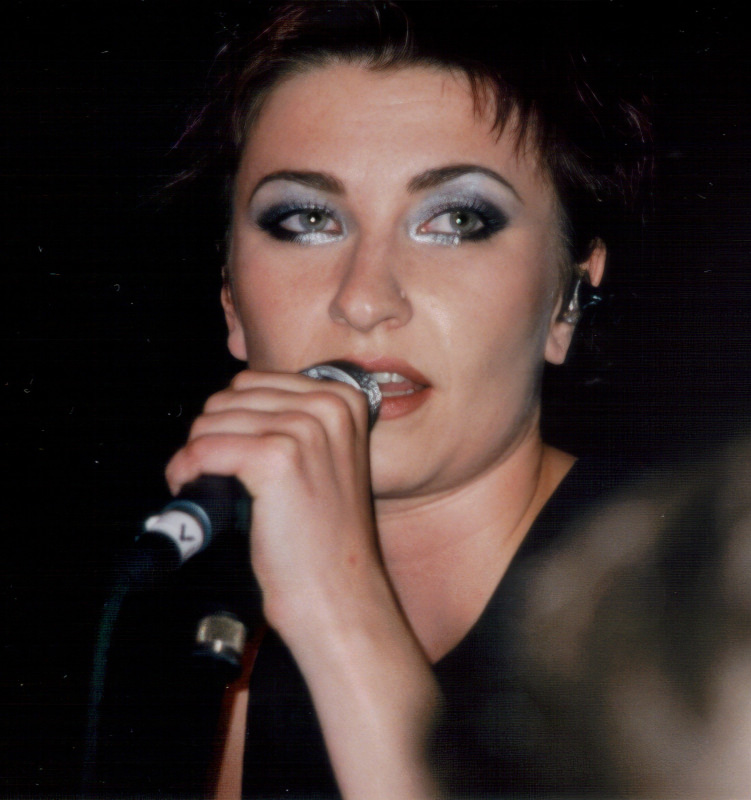
- Shelly Poole performing as part of Alisha's Attic in August 1998

Background information
- Born: Michelle Lena Poole; 20 March 1972 (age 54); Barking, London, England
- Genres: Pop, acoustic, alternative country
- Occupations: Singer, songwriter
- Years active: 1996–2001 (Alisha's Attic); 2005–present (solo career)
- Label: Shadowbirds
- Spouse: Ally McErlaine (m. 2001)
- Website: shellypoole.com

Michelle Lena "Shelly" Poole (born 20 March 1972) is an English songwriter and singer.

== Career ==
Shelly Poole is the daughter of the 1960s recording artist Brian Poole, of Brian Poole and the Tremeloes. With her sister Karen, she formed the band Alisha's Attic, and they released their debut album, Alisha Rules the World, in 1996. The band secured a Brit nomination and an Ivor Novello nomination for writing the million-seller single I Am, I Feel, and two years later a Capitol Radio award for most played song for The Incidentals. Alisha's Attic were also one of the UK highlights of the Lilith Tour started by Sarah McLachlan. After selling over one million records worldwide and having three top 20 albums, the duo split up in 2001, a year after The House We Built, their fourth album for Mercury Records, was released.

Poole married Ally McErlaine, the lead guitarist from the Scottish band Texas, in Glasgow on 5 October 2001. Poole went on to achieve success writing songs and producing for other artists throughout the late 1990s, and to the present day.

In late 2008, she formed the alternative country band Red Sky July, with McErlaine, and Charity Hair. Red Sky July were one of the first of a new wave of UK Country artists securing playlists on BBC Radio 2 and released three albums that entered the UK country charts in the top three. Poole signed to Gary Barlow's publishing company, San Remo Live. After San Remo, Poole signed to Stage Three Music, then three years later to BMG as a writer. Poole is currently with Be Unique.

Shelly is also a guest in the band the Dark Flowers, a collective of writers and artists started by Paul Statham.

== Recordings and songwriting ==
As a songwriter, Poole has written tracks for Janet Jackson, Jack Savoretti, Ronan Keating, Boyzone, Westlife, Ward Thomas, Michael Gray, Mark Ronson, Massive Attack, Roachford, and many more. Poole, along with Andy Hill, also wrote the single "I'll See You Again", for the album by Westlife, Where We Are.

Her solo album, Hard Time for the Dreamer, was released in September 2005 on the Transistor Project record label, and reached the Top 10 of the French and United Kingdom iTunes chart. Two songs from the album, "Anyday Now" and "Totally Underwater", were featured on an instore Starbucks album in 2006. Included on the album were two duets with Jack Savoretti.

She co wrote and sang on Michael Gray's dance release of 2006, "Borderline", which reached #12 on the UK Singles Chart and #3 on the ARIA club chart. In May 2006, Poole released "Lost in You". Her following release was "Totally Underwater", an EP, which included a remix of "Totally Underwater" by Andy Bradfield, and two tracks "One Kiss" and "What You Feel Like".
