= Sunscreem =

Techno/house music band

- Origin: Essex, England
- Genres: Techno; house; trance
- Years active: 1991–present
- Labels: Columbia; Sony Soho Square; Annalogic
- Members: Lucia Holm; Paul Carnell; Nick Slingsby
- Past members: Gary "Baz" Bailey; Duane Brazier; Rob Fricker; Darren Woodford; Sean Wright; Dave Valentine; Tony Rush; Wayne Simms; Kristien Buckle
- Website: http://sunscreem.com/

Sunscreem are an English techno/house music band from Essex that scored a number of hits on the US Hot Dance Music/Club Play chart throughout the 1990s and into the 21st century. Sunscreem also have the rare reputation as a techno-based band that successfully performs concerts. Over a ten-year period, 12 of their singles made an entry to the UK Singles Chart.

== Career ==
The nucleus of the group is lead vocalist/cellist/keyboardist Lucia Holm and fellow keyboardist Paul Carnell. The group has also, at times, included Darren Woodford, Rob Fricker, Sean Wright, Nick Slingsby (aka "Bongo Ted"), and DJ Dave Valentine.

Sunscreem released a 12" promo of "Love U More" on the Sony Soho Square record label in 1991, a song that went on to spend two weeks at No. 1 on the U.S. Dance chart in March 1993. The group also had club hits in the UK with the singles "Walk On" and "Pressure" (also on Sony Soho Square) before releasing their debut album O_{3} on multiple labels in 1993. Other singles from O_{3} included "Perfect Motion" and a cover of the Marianne Faithfull song "Broken English".

"Love U More" was one of the first techno songs to hit the U.S. Billboard Hot 100 Top 40, climbing to No. 36 (to date it is their only Hot 100 entry). It was subsequently covered (usually in a bowdlerized form, omitting the climactic reference to rape and toning down other images in the lyrics) by other artists including Paul Elstak, LMP, Rollergirl, and Steps.

The band are known for having their songs remixed by a wide variety of dance music producers, including Leftfield, Band of Gypsies, Carl Cox, Push, Rollo Armstrong from Faithless, Red Jerry, Matt Darey, Slam, X-Press 2, Trouser Enthusiasts, Robbie Rivera, Jimmy Gomez, K-Klass, Armand Van Helden, and Fire Island (Pete Heller and Terry Farley) among others.

Ahead of their second album, the group released a variety of tracks under alternative names, including a selection of 12-inch singles referred to as the Anna Series. This included the instrumental "Angel Dub," which was credited to Anna Din, and was featured on many compilations, such as Renaissance: The Mix Collection by Sasha & John Digweed. These tracks were released independently, breaking the terms of their contract with Sony, and leading to an increasingly strained relationship with the label.

The group's second album was called Change or Die, and from it, the band released the singles "When" (U.S. Dance No. 1), "Exodus," "White Skies," "Secrets," and "Looking at You" (U.S. Dance No. 2). Despite all these singles, the album was not commercially released in major territories outside the UK, and the band therefore negotiated its release from their Sony Music contract. Their next release was a mainly instrumental limited-edition CD called New Dark Times, issued on the band's own Kali label, which combined new material with tracks from the Anna Series and remixes from Change or Die.

The band subsequently signed with UK dance label Pulse-8. Their next single, "Catch" (U.K. Dance No. 1, U.S. Dance No. 2), was from an album titled Out of the Woods, but the label went bankrupt in 1997 before its completion, along with some other challenges at the time this meant that the album and the second single "Cover Me" were never released on the Pulse-8 label; though remixes of "Cover Me" by Trouser Enthusiasts appeared on compilations, and an unfinished version of the album was leaked online.

Since then, there have been a handful of releases and compilations such as the Sunscreem vs Push "Please Save Me" single (US Dance No. 26, UK Singles No. 40), and a re-release of "Perfect Motion" with new remixes by Starchaser and Way out West. In 2002, the group released Ten Mile Bank, which combined new and remixed material in the manner of New Dark Times, many of the tracks being club mixes of songs from the as yet unissued Out of the Woods. Lead singer Lucia Holm released a promo called "Heaven" (a cover of the Psychedelic Furs song) to radio stations in 2005, but it was never fully published as a 'solo' work. The track is instead featured on Out of the Woods as a Sunscreem work.

In May 2015, Sunscreem played at a series of local events to promote their album "Sweet Life", which was released on iTunes.

The band continues to perform live, which built up to Out of the Woods finally being released through the Annalogic label in November 2018.

In 2020 a video streaming (but audio only) compilation of remixes including some rarer mixes titled 'The Infinite Present - Sunscreem Remix Collection' was released.

A new track with the working title 'Be Do Have' was first performed live in 2024 and may feature on a studio album the band are currently working on.

In January 2025 an unmixed and remastered version of the album 'New Dark Times' was released. This has the full versions of the tracks on the album rather than the edited, continuous mix versions of the original.

== Discography ==
=== Albums ===
Year	Album	Peak chart positions	
Year	Album	UK	AUS
1993	O_{3}	33	73
1996	Change or Die	53	―
1996	New Dark Times	―	―
1998	Looking at You: Club Anthems	―	―
2001	Ten Mile Bank	―	―
2007	Club Classics (digital download)	―	―
2008	House Classics (iTunes exclusive)	―	―
2009	Love U More – The Very Best of Sunscreem	―	―
2015	Sweet Life	―	―
2018	Out of the Woods	―	―
2025	New Dark Times (Unmixed)	―	―
"—" denotes releases that did not chart, in some cases due to being limited releases that were therefore not chart-eligible or had too limited an audience to chart.

=== Singles ===
Year	Single title	Peak chart positions					Album	Notes
Year	Single title	UK	US	US Dance	AUS	CAN	Album	Notes
1991	"Walk On"	—	—	—	143	—	O_{3}	
1991	"Pressure"	60	—	—	—	—	O_{3}	
1992	"Love U More"	23	36	1	30	48	O_{3}	
1992	"Perfect Motion"	18	—	—	161	—	O_{3}	
1992	"Broken English"	13	—	—	101	—	O_{3}	Cover of the Marianne Faithfull song.
1993	"Pressure US"	19	—	1	64	—	O_{3}	Remake of "Pressure"
1995	"When"	47	—	1	205	—	Change or Die	
1995	"Exodus"	40	—	—	—	—	Change or Die	
1995	"White Skies"	25	—	—	—	—	Change or Die	
1996	"Secrets"	36	—	—	—	—	Change or Die	
1996	"Looking at You"	—	—	2	—	—	Change or Die	
1997	"Catch"	55	—	2	—	—	Out of the Woods	
1999	"No Angel"	—	—	35	—	—	Change or Die	
1999	"Exodus '99"	155	—	—	—	—	Change or Die	
2001	"Please Save Me"	36	—	26	—	—	New Dark Times	Credited to Sunscreem vs Push. Remix of the track "Who Will Love Me Now?"
2001	"Coda"	—	—	—	—	—	Ten Mile Bank	
2002	"Perfect Motion 2002"	71	—	—	—	—	O_{3}	
2008	"Perfect Motion" (remix)	—	—	—	—	—	O_{3}	Credited to James Fitch featuring Sunscreem.
"—" denotes releases that did not chart or were not released in that territory.

=== Under aliases ===
- Anna Din: "Angel" / "Angel Dub" (1994)
- Anna Crusis: "XS" / "Syclik" (1994)
- Anna Nas: Untitled (1994)
- Chiba: "Time Flies" (1997)
- DJ AWOL: "Absent" (2002)

The "Anna series" were issued on 12" only. Variants of these tracks were subsequently issued (some under different titles) on Change or Die, New Dark Times and the "Exodus" single. "Time Flies" was an extended version of "A Brief History of Nonsense" from New Dark Times, itself a radical remix of "Exodus".

In addition, DJs Darren Tate and Judge Jules had a hit in 2000 with "It's My Turn" credited to Angelic, which was their previously-issued remix of Sunscreem's "Change" with the original vocal track replaced with a new one by Jules' wife Amanda O'Riordan. The track reached number 11 in the UK singles chart.

== See also ==
- List of number-one dance hits (United States)
- List of artists who reached number one on the US Dance chart
