= Zeeteah Massiah =

Barbadian-born British singer

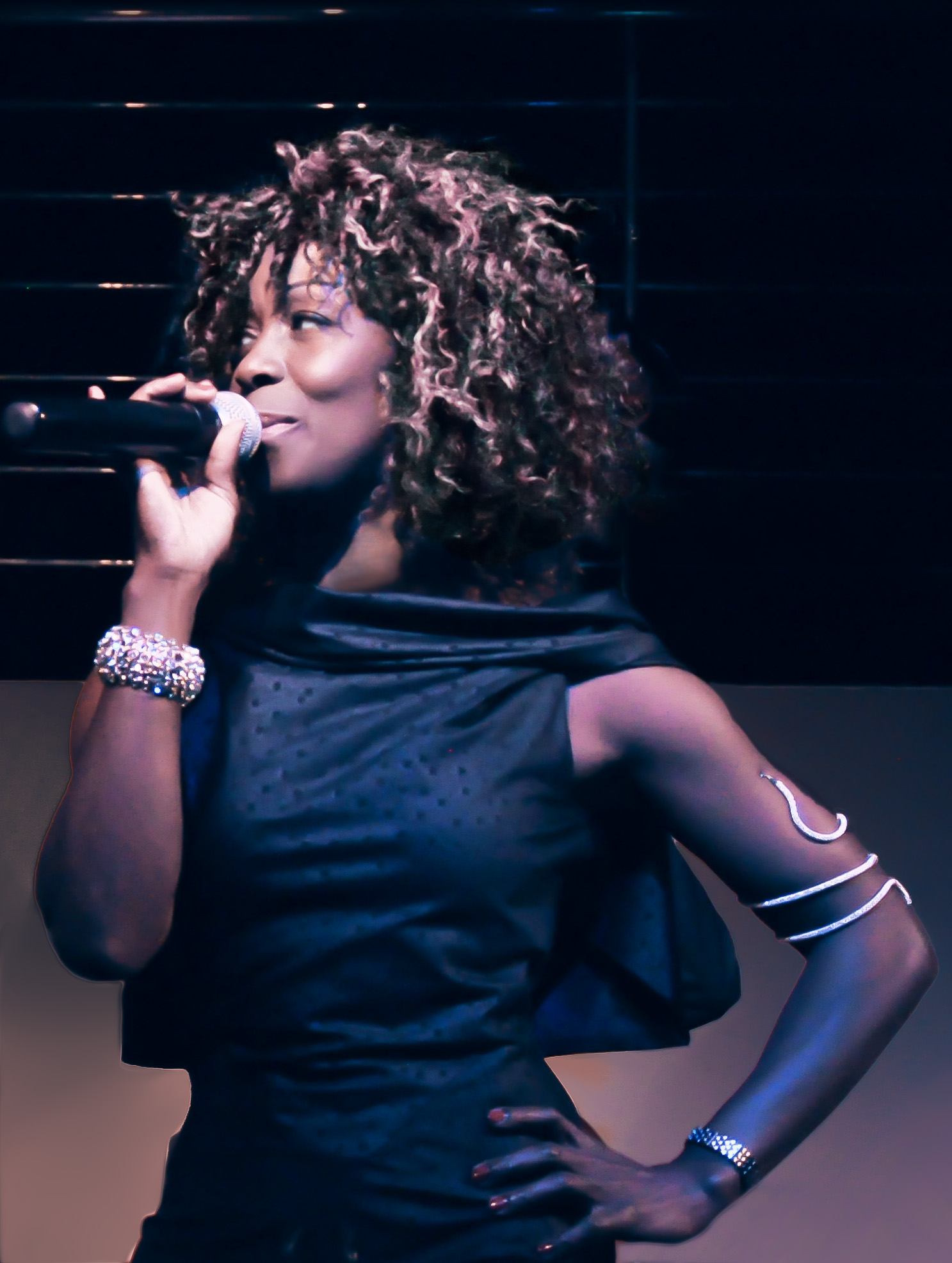
- Massiah in 2013

Background information
- Born: Zeeteah Silveta Massiah; 24 December 1956 (age 69); Saint John, Barbados
- Occupation: Singer
- Years active: 1980–present
- Spouse: Paul Caplin
- Website: zeeteah.com
- Musical career
- Genres: Reggae, Jazz, House
- Instrument: Vocals
- Labels: Union City; Virgin; Swing City; Creative Control
- Member of: Caplin & Massiah
- Formerly of: Arizona

Zeeteah Silveta Massiah (born 24 December 1956) is a Barbadian-born British singer particularly associated with reggae, jazz and house music. She is one half of the duo Caplin & Massiah.

In a wide-ranging career she has recorded and/or toured with artists including Robbie Williams, Tom Jones, Michael Jackson, Phil Collins, Sting and Leo Sayer. She is best known in the United States as the lead vocalist on the 1993 Billboard No.1 dance hit Slide on the Rhythm.

Massiah was born in Saint John, Barbados and grew up in London. In 2001 she moved to Germany, and in 2012 returned to England, where she now lives.

== Biography ==
Born in Barbados, Zeeteah moved to London with her parents when she was five years old. Her first name was originally spelled Zeitia. As a teenager she recorded a cover of Michael Jackson's We Got A Good Thing Going in a reggae style for RG Records. She went on to record two more reggae tracks for the label.

In 1984, Massiah appeared for nine months as Chiffon in the hit musical Little Shop of Horrors in London.

She has been an additional vocalist for artists including Barry Manilow and Boy George, and toured with Climie Fisher and Paul Weller. In 1988, she sang with Kim Wilde on the European leg of Michael Jackson's BAD tour and, in 1994/95, toured the world with Tom Jones. She has also toured extensively with Eikichi Yazawa and Johnny Hallyday, among the most successful rock stars in Japan and France respectively.

In 1993, Massiah was the lead vocalist on the Arizona track "Slide on the Rhythm", later remixed by C&C Music Factory, which was a No. 1 hit on the Billboard Dance Chart in the US. She went on to record "I Specialise in Love" with Arizona, which was a UK chart hit.

On the back of her success with Arizona, Massiah signed a deal with Virgin Records, and released two singles: "Sexual Prime", which was a UK club hit, and "This Is The Place", which charted on the UK Singles Chart. In 1996 she was a UK finalist in the Eurovision Song Contest with "A Little Love".

In 2001, Massiah moved to Cologne, Germany, where she worked with a wide range of musicians, and recorded the single "Lovely Deep". During this time she spent nine months as featured singer in the hit show Fantissima, and spent three months touring Japan with Eikichi Yazawa.

In 2012, she returned to London to be with her partner Paul Caplin, and the two were married in 2016. Massiah performs regularly in London, playing songs composed by Caplin as well as her own interpretations of musical classics. She has released two albums produced by Caplin: Juice (2014), an album of original songs, and Maybe Tomorrow (2016), a collection of classics. The duo also released the single "All You" on 13 July 2018 under the name Caplin & Massiah. On 18 November 2022 Massiah released "Wat A Ting", an album of reggae and dancehall music.

In 2024 Massiah and Caplin launched Caplin & Massiah as their primary musical identity. They have released three singles and an album under this name to significant critical acclaim. In 2025 the album Wat a Ting was rebranded as a Caplin & Massiah release.

== Discography ==
=== Singles ===
- 1980 "We Got A Good Thing Going"
- 1980 "A Love Like Yours"
- 1981 "I'm Still Waiting"
- 1991 "(Homegirl) Sing The Blues"
- 1992 "Feel My Love"
- 1993 "Slide on the Rhythm" – Arizona feat. Zeitia
- 1994 "This Is The Place"
- 1994 "Keep It Up" – Sharada House Gang feat. Zeitia Massiah
- 1994 "I Specialize in Love" – Arizona feat. Zeitia
- 1996 "Sweet Love" – With It Guys feat. Zeitia
- 1996 "Sexual Prime"
- 1997 "You Got It" – Fargetta feat. Zeitia Massiah (five tracks on album)
- 1997 "Beat of Green" – Fargetta feat. Zeitia Massiah
- 1998 "Wishing on a Star" – Curtis & Moore presenting Zeitia Massiah (remixed by Mousse T)
- 1998 "Wishing on a Star Part 2" – Curtis & Moore presenting Zeitia Massiah
- 1998 "Baby Come Back" – North on 41 feat. Zeitia Massiah
- 1998 "You Came" – North on 41 feat. Zeitia Massiah
- 2005 "Lovely Deep"
- 2014 "Whatever This Is"
- 2022 "Wat A Ting"

=== Albums ===
- 2013 Live in London
- 2014 Juice
- 2016 Maybe Tomorrow

=== Guest vocals ===
==== Singles ====
- 1989 "Keep Each Other Warm" – Barry Manilow
- 1989 "Strong Enough" – One Nation
- 1989 "What You See" – One Nation
- 1989 "My Commitment" – One Nation
- 1990 "Sweet Meat" – The Soup Dragons
- 1990 "Close to You" – Maxi Priest
- 1991 "Born Free" – Vic Reeves
- 1994 "Generations of Love" – Boy George
- 1994 "Rock My Heart" – Haddaway
- 1995 "Let's Push It" – Nightcrawlers
- 1995 "Should I Ever" – Nightcrawlers
- 1995 "You Lift Me Up" – Nightcrawlers
- 1996 "Born Free" – Happy Clappers
- 1996 "Maria" – Eikichi Yazawa
- 1996 "Naked" – Louise

==== Albums ====
- 1989 Trouble in the Home – Thrashing Doves
- 1991 Abracadabra – ABC
- 1993 Parc des Princes – Johnny Hallyday
- 1996 Smashing! – Right Said Fred
- 1999 Absolute O'Brien – Richard O'Brien
- 2021 Evolve – Gūnther Asbek

== See also ==
- List of number-one dance hits (United States)
- List of artists who reached number one on the US Dance chart
