= Illumina (Alisha's Attic album) =

Album by Alisha's Attic

Studio album by Alisha's Attic
- Released: 5 October 1998
- Studio: The Looking Glass Studios, New York City; Platinum Studios, New York City; The Church, London; Metropolitan Studios, Chiswick, London; Matrix Studios, Little Russell Street, London
- Genre: Pop; alternative
- Length: 49:57
- Label: Mercury
- Producer: Mark Plati; David A. Stewart; Alisha's Attic

Alisha's Attic chronology
Japanese Dream (1997)	Illumina (1998)	The House We Built (2001)

Illumina is the third album by Alisha's Attic, and the second to be released internationally. It was released on 5 October 1998, and peaked at #15 on the UK album chart. Three of its tracks were released as singles: "The Incidentals" (which reached #13 in the UK charts), "Wish I Were You" and "Barbarella".

== Track listing ==
All tracks composed and arranged by Alisha's Attic (Karen Poole, Shelly Poole and Terry Martin)

1. "The Incidentals" – 3:10
2. "Going Down" – 4:32
3. "Shameless" – 1:27
4. "Resistor" – 3:34
5. "Air and Angels" – 3:36
6. "Wish I Were You" – 3:49
7. "Me and the Dolphins" – 1:30
8. "Barbarella" – 3:58
9. "Are You Jealous?" – 3:56
10. "Lazy Head" – 3:47
11. "Do I Lie?" – 3:28
12. "Karmically Close" – 3:34
13. "Dive In" – 3:57
14. "Lay Low" – 2:51
15. "Outta These Clouds" – 2:39

== Personnel ==
Alisha's Attic

- Karen Poole - vocals
- Shelly Poole - vocals

with:

- Ann Klein, David A. Stewart, Marcus Myers, Mike Lustig, Reeves Gabrels - guitar
- Mark Plati - guitar, bass, keyboards, programming, percussion, string arrangements on "The Incidentals" and "Lay Low"
- Dave Catlin-Birch - bass on "Barbarella"
- Fil Eisler - bass on "Do I Lie?"
- Reece Gilmore - keyboards, programming
- Kenny Dickenson - additional keyboards on "Barbarella"
- Chris Sharrock - drums, percussion
- Mike Levesque, Shawn Pelton - drums
- Everett Bradley - percussion
- Amanda Riesman - string arrangement on "Dive In"

Technical

- Mark Plati - engineer, mixing
- Nick Addison - engineer, mixing
- Ash Howes - mixing
- Tom Bird - art direction
- Andy Earl - photography
