= The Weekend (Michael Gray song) =

2004 single by Michael Gray

Single by Michael Gray
- Released: 1 November 2004
- Length: 7:52 (original 12-inch mix); 3:12 (radio edit)
- Label: Eye Industries; Universal
- Songwriters: Michael Gray; Oliver Cheatham; Jim Irvin; Sally Still
- Producer: Michael Gray

Michael Gray singles chronology
"Whatcha Gonna Do" (2004)	"The Weekend" (2004)	"Borderline" (2006)

Shèna singles chronology
"Dirty Little Dream" (2004)	"The Weekend" (2004)	"Your Day Is Coming" (2005)

Music video
- "The Weekend" on YouTube

"The Weekend" is a song by English DJ Michael Gray, with vocals provided by singer Shèna. It was released on 1 November 2004 and peaked at number seven on the UK Singles Chart, topped the UK and Hungarian dance charts, and reached the top 20 in several other countries, including Australia, Italy, and the Netherlands. In the United States, it peaked at number five on the Billboard Dance Radio Airplay chart in February 2005.

== Composition ==
The song uses the lyric "I can't wait for Saturday to begin", from the 1983 single "Get Down Saturday Night" by American singer Oliver Cheatham, but changing the word "Saturday" with "the weekend"; Cheatham is credited as co-writer, accordingly. The track also contains in the hook a reworked sample from the 1984 song "Back at Ya" by American group Kerr.

== Critical reception ==
Michael Paoletta of Billboard called the song, a "decidely pop jam-with dollops of disco memories".

== Music video ==
A music video directed by Mike Harris was made for the song.

== Track listings ==
UK CD single

1. "The Weekend" (radio edit)
2. "The Weekend" (extended vocal mix)
3. "The Weekend" (original 12-inch mix)
4. "The Weekend" (Nic Fanciulli vocal mix)
5. "The Weekend" (video)

UK 12-inch single 1

A. "The Weekend" (extended vocal mix)
B. "The Weekend" (original 12-inch mix)

UK 12-inch single 2

A. "The Weekend" (Nic Fanciulli vocal mix)
B. "The Weekend" (Nic Fanciulli dub mix)

German, Austrian, and Swiss CD single

1. "The Weekend" (radio mix) – 3:12
2. "The Weekend" (vocal 12-inch version) – 8:09
3. "The Weekend" (original 12-inch version) – 7:52
4. "The Weekend" (Nic Fanciulli vocal mix) – 8:52
5. "The Weekend" (Da Loop Brothers Meets Sunloverz remix) – 6:49
6. "The Weekend" (video) – 3:12

Australian CD single

1. "The Weekend" (radio edit)
2. "The Weekend" (extended vocal mix)
3. "The Weekend" (original 12-inch mix)
4. "The Weekend" (Nic Fanciulli vocal mix)

== Charts ==
=== Weekly charts ===
Chart (2004–2006)	Peak position
Australia (ARIA)	14
Australian Club Chart (ARIA)	1
Austria (Ö3 Austria Top 40)	49
Belgium (Ultratop 50 Flanders)	11
Belgium (Ultratop 50 Wallonia)	29
CIS Airplay (TopHit)	73
Finland (Suomen virallinen lista)	19
France (SNEP)	36
Germany (GfK)	22
Greece (IFPI)	10
Hungary (Rádiós Top 40)	18
Hungary (Dance Top 40)	1
Ireland (IRMA)	22
Ireland Dance (IRMA)	3
Italy (FIMI)	20
Netherlands (Dutch Top 40)	12
Netherlands (Single Top 100)	29
Romania (Romanian Top 100)	60
Russia Airplay (TopHit)	71
Scottish Singles Sales (Official Charts)	7
Switzerland (Schweizer Hitparade)	49
UK Singles (Official Charts)	7
UK Dance (Official Charts)	1
Ukraine Airplay (TopHit)	30
US Dance Airplay (Billboard)	5

=== Year-end charts ===
Chart (2004)	Position
Australian Club Chart (ARIA)	15
Netherlands (Dutch Top 40)	102
UK Singles (OCC)	113

Chart (2005)	Position
Australian Club Chart (ARIA)	43
US Hot Dance Airplay (Billboard)	41

== Certifications ==
Region	Certification	Certified units/sales
New Zealand (RMNZ)	Gold	15,000^{‡}
United Kingdom (BPI)	Platinum	600,000^{‡}
^{‡} Sales+streaming figures based on certification alone.
