= Hard Time for the Dreamer =

Studio album by Shelly Poole
- Released: September 2005
- Recorded: Loki studio, Backroom studio
- Length: 40:13
- Label: Transistor Project
- Producer: Shelly Poole, Paul Statham

Shelly Poole chronology
| Hard Time for the Dreamer (2005) | In Gold (2007) |

Professional ratings
Review scores
| Source | Rating |
|---|---|
| BBC.co.uk | Positive |
| The Times | 4/5 stars |
| Independent on Sunday | 4/5 stars |
| Music Week | Positive |

Hard Time for the Dreamer is the debut album by Shelly Poole, released on 26 September 2005, on Transistor Project Records.

== Track listing ==
1. "Hard Time For The Dreamer"
2. "Totally Underwater"
3. "Little Wonder"
4. "Out In The Open"
5. "Don't Look That Way"
6. "Anyday Now" (featuring Jack Savoretti)
7. "If You Will Be Pilot"
8. "Lost In You"
9. "Lose Yourself"
10. "Hope" (featuring Jack Savoretti)

The Disc of Hard Time for the Dreamer
