= Alisha Rules the World =

Studio album by Alisha's Attic
- Released: 4 November 1996
- Recorded: The Church Studios (Crouch End, London)
- Genre: Pop
- Length: 45:58
- Label: Mercury
- Producer: Dave Stewart

Alisha's Attic chronology
Alisha Rules the World (1996)	Japanese Dream (1997)

Singles from Alisha Rules the World
- 1. "I Am, I Feel" Released: 15 July 1996; 2. "Alisha Rules the World" Released: 21 October 1996; 3. "Indestructible" Released: 1997; 4. "Air We Breathe" Released: 30 June 1997

Professional ratings
Review scores
Source	Rating
AllMusic	3/5 stars
The Guardian	4/5 stars
Music Week	5/5 stars

Alisha Rules the World is the debut album by English pop duo Alisha's Attic, released on 4 November 1996. The album received positive reviews, and went platinum in the following year, selling 400,000 copies in the UK (with another 100,000 in Japan). The four singles released from the album all reached the top 20 of the UK Singles Chart.

On 17 April 2026 the album was re-released as a 30th anniversary edition on 180g black vinyl in a gatefold sleeve.

== Track listing ==
All tracks composed by Karen Poole, Shelly Poole and Terry Martin.

1. "Irresistible U Are" – 1:49
2. "Intense" – 3:55
3. "I Am, I Feel" – 4:00
4. "Alisha Rules the World" – 4:34
5. "White Room" – 4:13
6. "Stone in My Shoe" – 4:39
7. "Personality Lines" – 0:54
8. "Indestructible" – 3:39
9. "I Won't Miss You" – 4:01
10. "The Golden Rule" – 1:34
11. "Just the Way You Like It" – 3:57
12. "Air We Breathe" – 4:37
13. "Adore U" – 3:57

Note: "Indestructible" was consistently misspelt as "Indestructable" on CD and printed covers as was "Irresistible" misspelt as "Irresistable".

== Personnel ==
Alisha's Attic

- Karen Poole – vocals
- Shelly Poole – vocals

with:

- Dave Stewart – "all guitars and fairy dust"
- Chucho Merchán – bass, double bass
- Terry Disley – keyboards
- Andy Wright, Garry Hughes, Paul Taylor – keyboards, programming
- Kat Evans – electric violin
- Olle Romo – additional programming on "Air We Breathe"
- Caroline Dale – cello on "Air We Breathe"
- Fenella Barton, Thomas Bowes – violin on "Air We Breathe"
- Andrew Brown – viola on "Air We Breathe"

== Charts ==
=== Weekly charts ===
Chart (1996–1997)	Peak position
Australian Albums (ARIA)	54
German Albums (Offizielle Top 100)	58
Scottish Albums (Official Charts)	29
UK Albums (Official Charts)	14

=== Year-end charts ===
Chart (1996)	Position
UK Albums (OCC)	87

Chart (1997)	Position
UK Albums (OCC)	58

== Certifications ==
Region	Certification	Certified units/sales
United Kingdom (BPI)	Platinum	300,000^{^}
^{^} Shipments figures based on certification alone.
