= Supafly =

English dance act

SUPAFLY
- Origin: London, England
- Genres: Dance, house, hip hop, reggae
- Years active: 2000–present
- Members: Panos Liassi; Andrew Tumi
- Past members: Chris Papathanasiou

Supafly (also known as Supafly Inc.) are an English dance act, composed of Panos Liassi (Mister P) and Andrew Tumi (One).

== Musical career ==
Supafly is best known for 2005's "Let's Get Down", which was a club hit around the world and used by the Australian television network FOX8 as their summer theme song; and for "Moving Too Fast" in late 2006, which sampled the Phil Collins' hit "Another Day in Paradise". Supafly picked up the Best Newcomer Award at the 2006 Urban Music Awards.

Supafly's sound is a blend of reggae, hip hop and dance. Their success has led them to sold out tours, performing to crowds of up to 25,000.

Now based in London, the group's musical style was influenced by the members' time in Melbourne, Australia. During this period, they wrote the track "Let's Get Down," which was composed during a period of record-high temperatures in Australia.

== Members ==
=== wOne ===
wOne is an accomplished British-Ghanaian singer, songwriter and producer. He has collaborated on several seminal dance hits and enjoyed a successful career spanning more than fifteen years with Supafly. wOne was involved in creating the genre "Afro-sexy" through his dance events "wOne dance" featuring pounding West African rhythms fused with euphoric house.

=== Mister P ===
Mister P (Panos Liassi) was involved in the production of the singles "Passion" by Amen! UK; "Ripped in 2 Minutes" by A vs B; "Lover" (featuring Rachel McFarlane), "Pleasure Love" by De Funk and the Supafly Inc songs "Let's Get Down" and "Moving Too Fast". In the 1990s, he worked with A Homeboy Hippie and Funky Dread and was part of "Project One", "Blu Room", "Rated Pg", "London Fiesta" & "Apollo". Mister P produced some house and jungle/drum and bass tracks during this time, usually with collaborators. He went on to claim credit as the man behind acts such as Amen UK (Positiva Records), De Funk (Sony), A vs. B (Positiva), and co-produced "Pacjam" by Eye Industries.

In addition, Mister P's credits include remixing for Annie Lennox, Prince, Ricky Martin, Cher, David Morales, Goldie, Coolio, D:Ream, Edwin Starr, Livin' Joy and Kathy Brown.

== Discography ==
=== Charted singles ===
List of charted singles, with selected chart positions
Year	Single	Peak chart positions					
Year	Single	AUS	BEL (Fl)	FIN	FRA	NED	UK
2005	"Let's Get Down" (vs. Fishbowl)	30	48	—	44	31	22
2006	"Moving Too Fast"	72	28	8	—	48	23
2008	"Be Together"	—	—	—	—	72	—
"—" denotes releases that did not chart
