= Michael Gray (DJ) =

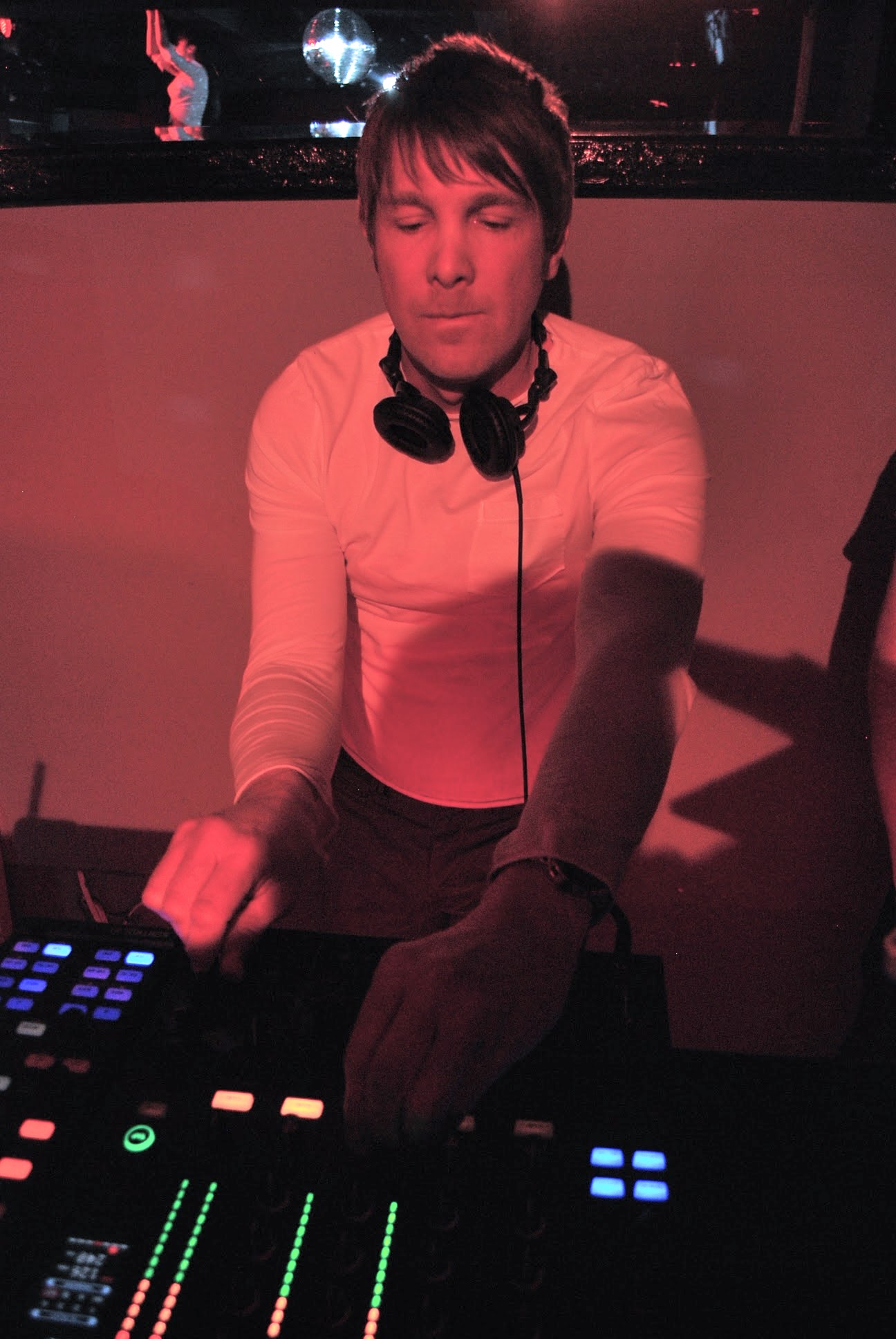
- Gray performing in 2011

Background information
- Also known as: Mike Gray; M
- Born: Michael Anthony Shefford Gray; July 25, 1966 (age 60)
- Origin: Croydon, London, England
- Genres: Dance-pop; nu-disco; house
- Occupations: DJ; record producer
- Instruments: Keyboards; synthesizer; music sequencer; samplers; drum machine
- Years active: 1990–present
- Labels: Altra Moda Music; Sultra Records

Michael Anthony Shefford Gray (born 25 July 1966) is a British DJ and house music producer. He is also half of the dance music production and remixing duo Full Intention.

== Biography ==
In 1989, Michael Gray worked at a club in Croydon called East Street when he met Jon Pearn. He created a megamix entitled "The Brits 1990 (Dance Medley)" for that year's awards ceremony which peaked at #2 on the UK Singles Chart. In 2002, he released the single "So Fly" for Defected Records under the name M, which peaked at number 96 on the UK charts. In 2004, he began issuing records under his own name, the first being "The Weekend", a worldwide hit in late that year. It peaked at #7 on the UK Singles Chart when licensed through UMTV on Eye Industries, and also notched up over 20,000 plays on the radio. In the United States, "The Weekend" was a top 10 hit on Billboard's Hot Dance Airplay chart in 2005, where it was released on Ultra Records. It featured in a Honda commercial and also in an Ugly Betty episode, "Sofia's Choice", in 2007.

The follow-up to "The Weekend" was "Borderline" featuring vocals from Shelly Poole, formerly of Alisha's Attic, released on 24 July 2006. The track peaked at #3 on the ARIA Club Chart and at #12 on the UK Singles Chart. In 2007, an album, Analog Is On, was released briefly only in Japan. A third single, "Somewhere Beyond", peaked at #5 on the Australian ARIA Club Chart.

Gray's 2000s productions include: Full Intention's "I Believe in You" (2005), Miami Ice's "Better Than Perfect" (2005), "Whatcha Gonna Do" as Hi Fashion featuring Maria Lawson (2005), and "Ready for This" as Robot Man (featuring Nanchang Nancy) (2008). In 2009, with his new label Full Intention Records, he released new versions of Full Intention's "Once in a Lifetime", "I Will Follow" and "Forever".

His early 2010s productions include Michael Gray, Paul Harris, Kid Massive & Sam Obernik's "Home" (2010), Michael Gray, Paul Harris & Jon Pearn feat. Amanda Wilson's "Caught Up" (2010), and Michael Gray, Jon Pearn, Rob Roar & Cassandra Fox's "Lights Down Low" (2010). In 2010, Gray appeared at Belgrade Arena DJing alongside David Guetta. In late 2010, Gray made a remix of the song "It's OK" by Cee Lo Green. In 2011, he released a single titled "Remember" with Marco Lys. In 2013, he released another single with Marco Lys titled "The Underground". In 2013, he released under the name MGNY the single "My World" featuring the vocalist NY.

With Full Intention, the most popular tracks he released were "Keep Pushing" in 2016 and "I Miss You" in 2017. In 2016, Michael Gray released new versions of his hit "Walk Into The Sun", notably with a Full Intention remix. In 2018, Full Intention made a remix of a David Penn's song featuring Lisa Millett entitled "Join Us". In 2018, Michael Gray released a single entitled "Keep Moving On", featuring the vocalists Kimberley Brown and Shirley Marie Graham. In 2019, he released the tracks "24 7 People", "Take Me Back" and "Brother Brother". The same year, his remix of Sylvester's hit "You Make Me Feel (Mighty Real)" was real success on the charts and was played by many DJs in clubs and concerts.

In 2020, Gray released a new "Sultra Mix" of his song "The Weekend". The same year, he worked with vocalist RoRoe to produce a track titled "The One", released on Sultra Records. In September 2020, he released a track titled "The Sun" with the Melody Men. Gray was ranked #1 on the "Top Artists of 2020" by Traxsource. The same year he released a few remixes with DJ Mark Knight. Since 2020, Gray's club tracks were often real DJ hits, and often in the top 10 of Traxsource's charts.

From 2021 to 2023, Gray collaborated with Australian DJ and producer Dr. Packer to release several remixes of tracks by famous house and disco artists like Brenda Taylor and Siege, for example.

2023 saw Gray release his educational music-production course Making a Modern Disco Classic.

In April 2024, nearly 30 years after its original mix, Gray released an official remix of Jamiroquai's "Space Cowboy". In May 2024, Gray released an album titled "Optimism" on Sultra Records. Moreover, Gray was ranked #1 at the "Top Artists Of 2024" by Traxsource.

In January 2025, Gray released a new remix of a track by Change & Tanya Michelle Smith titled "Sunrise Forever". The same month, he released a single called "Over You" featuring RoRoe. In April 2025, Gray released a remix of a track titled "If I'm Gonna Be With You" by Gwen Dickey (a member of the famous disco band Rose Royce).

In January 2026, Michael Gray invited Seamus Haji in his DJ Show called "Thankful Thursday". In May 2026, he released a new album titled "You & Me".

Gray played DJ sets in many countries, notably in England (Night Tales in London), Spain (Hï Ibiza, Cafe Mambo), Poland (Baltic Summer Festival), Germany (Wangels), the Philippines, Australia (with his Australia Tour 2026), New Zealand (As part of the Australia Tour 2026), Russia, Brazil, Croatia (Defected Festival), Georgia and the Netherlands (Notably during the Amsterdam Dance Event).

== Early and personal life ==
Gray was born and raised in Croydon, London, England. He started getting into music when he was around 5–6 years old, with his family buying records. He was inspired by his 4 older sisters who were into various kinds of music, including soul and pop. He was inspired to become a musician after one of his sisters’ boyfriends, a DJ, would bring his equipment for Christmas and his family would party. His father, who played keyboard, often organized under-16 disco dances.

Gray currently lives in Surrey, England. He has three sons.

He got engaged to long term girlfriend Melanie Lee on 1 January 2026.

== Discography ==
=== Studio albums ===
- Analog Is On (2007)
- Optimism (2024)

=== Singles ===
Year	Single	Peak chart positions									Album
Year	Single	UK	AUS	AUT	BEL	FIN	GER	IRE	NED	SWI	Album
1990	"The Brits 1990 (Dance Medley)" (credited to Various Artists)	2	56	—	—	—	—	—	24	—	Singles only
2004	"Whatcha Gonna Do" (featuring Maria Lawson)	193	—	—	—	—	—	—	—	—	Singles only
2004	"The Weekend"	7	14	49	11	19	22	22	12	49	Analog Is On
2006	"Borderline" (featuring Shelly Poole)	12	49	63	52	—	42	42	—	75	Analog Is On
2007	"Somewhere Beyond" (featuring Steve Edwards)	—	100	—	—	—	86	—	—	—	Analog Is On
2008	"Ready for This" (featuring Nanchang Nancy)	—	—	—	—	—	—	—	—	—	Singles only
2011	"Piece of You" (featuring Laura Kidd)	—	—	—	—	—	—	—	—	—	Singles only
2012	"Can't Wait for the Weekend" (featuring Roll Deep)	—	—	—	—	—	—	—	—	—	X
2013	"My World" (featuring NY)	—	—	—	—	—	—	—	—	—	Singles only
2016	"Walk into the Sun" (featuring Ann Saunderson)	—	—	—	—	—	—	—	—	—	Singles only
2018	"Keep Moving On" (featuring Kimberley Brown and Shirley Marie Graham)	—	—	—	—	—	—	—	—	—	Singles only
2019	"24 7 People"	—	—	—	—	—	—	—	—	—	Singles only
2019	"Take Me Back"	—	—	—	—	—	—	—	—	—	Singles only
2019	"Brother Brother" (featuring Kimberley Brown)	—	—	—	—	—	—	—	—	—	Singles only
2020	"The One" (featuring RoRoe)	—	—	—	—	—	—	—	—	—	Singles only
2020	"The Sun" (featuring The Melody Men)	—	—	—	—	—	—	—	—	—	Singles only
2020	"MacArthur Park" (featuring Kelli Sae)	—	—	—	—	—	—	—	—	—	Singles only
2021	"Over & Over" (featuring Kelli Sae)	—	—	—	—	—	—	—	—	—	Singles only
2021	"Jump In" (featuring RoRoe)	—	—	—	—	—	—	—	—	—	Singles only
2024	"Season High" (featuring Tatiana Owens)	—	—	—	—	—	—	—	—	—	Optimism
2024	"Save Me" (featuring Leela D)	—	—	—	—	—	—	—	—	—	Optimism
2024	"Ivy" (featuring Tatiana Owens)	—	—	—	—	—	—	—	—	—	Optimism
2025	"Over You" (featuring RoRoe)	—	—	—	—	—	—	—	—	—	Single only
2026	"Ascension" (featuring Bran Mazz)	—	—	—	—	—	—	—	—	—	You & Me
2026	"You & Me" (featuring Mike Dunn)	—	—	—	—	—	—	—	—	—	You & Me
2026	"Universe"	—	—	—	—	—	—	—	—	—	You & Me
"—" denotes releases that did not chart.

=== Selected remixes ===
- 2004 Scape featuring D´Empress – Be My Friend (Michael Gray Remix)
- 2005 Yanou – Sun Is Shining (Michael Gray Remix)
- 2007 Splittr – All Alone (Michael Gray Remix)
- 2008 Seamus Haji, Lords Of Flatbush – 24 Hours (Michael Gray Remix)
- 2008 Cicada – Beautiful (Michael Gray Remix)
- 2008 Priors – What You Need (Michael Gray Remix)
- 2008 Danism – Strike (Michael Gray Remix)
- 2009 Kläder & Vapen Featuring Anna Ternheim – What Have I Done (Michael Gray Remix)
- 2009 Gary Go – Open Arms (Michael Gray Remix)
- 2009 Visage – Fade to Grey (Michael Gray Mix 2009)
- 2010 Izzy Stardust and Dumb Dan – Looking Out For A Bigger Love (Michael Gray Club Mix)
- 2010 Valeriya – All That I Want (Michael Gray Remix)
- 2010 Cee Lo Green – It's OK (Michael Gray Remix)
- 2011 Sterling Void – Runaway Girl (Michael Gray Remix)
- 2012 Tara McDonald – Give Me More (Michael Gray Remix)
- 2013 Kamaliya – Love Me Like (Michael Gray Remix)
- 2015 Electronic Youth – Be Right There (Michael Gray Remix)
- 2019 Advance – Take Me To The Top (Michael Gray Remix)
- 2019 Sylvester – You Make Me Feel (Mighty Real) (Michael Gray Remix)
- 2019 Alton Edwards – I Just Wanna (Spend Some Time with You) (Michael Gray Remix)
- 2019 Mahogany – Ride On The Rhythm (Michael Gray Remix)
- 2019 Raw Silk – Just In Time (Michael Gray Remix)
- 2019 Billy Porter – Love Yourself (Michael Gray Club Remix)
- 2019 Husky, Brazen – Only One Way (Michael Gray Remix)
- 2019 Karen Harding and Who – I Don't Need Love (Mark Knight and Michael Gray Remix)
- 2020 Bobby D'Ambrosio featuring Lasala – Runaway Love (Michael Gray Remix)
- 2020 Jasper Street Co. – Paradise (Mark Knight & Michael Gray Remix)
- 2020 Glen Horsborough & IDA fLO – Switched On (Michael Gray Remix)
- 2020 Chevals – Thank You For The Ride (Michael Gray Remix)
- 2020 World Premiere – Share The Night (Michael Gray Remix)
- 2020 Vicky D – The Beat Is Mine (Michael Gray Remix)
- 2020 Homero Espinosa feat. Tobirus Mozelle – Love Is The Cure (Michael Gray Remix)
- 2020 Serious Intentions – You Don't Know (Michael Gray Remix)
- 2020 Chanelle, Eric Kupper – One Man (Michael Gray Remix)
- 2020 Anané – Get On The Funk Train (Michael Gray & Mark Knight Mix)
- 2020 Lou Casablanca – Move With The Beat (Michael Gray Remix)
- 2020 Kelli Sae – Good Love (Michael Gray Extended Mix)
- 2020 Hi Voltage – Let's Get Horny (Michael Gray Remix)
- 2021 Supakings – Back and Forth (Michael Gray Remix)
- 2021 Raze – Break 4 Love (Michael Gray Remix)
- 2021 Cultural Vibe – Ma Foom Bey (Michael Gray Remix)
- 2021 Brian Power – Optimistic (feat. Lucita Jules) (Michael Gray Remix)
- 2021 The S.O.S Band – Just Get Ready (Michael Gray Remix)
- 2021 Ingram – D.J.'s Delight (Mark Knight & Michael Gray Extended)
- 2021 Risqué Connection - Saturday (Michael Gray Remix)
- 2021 Junior Jack presents Glory feat. Jocelyn Brown - Hold Me Up (Michael Gray Extended Remix)
- 2021 World Premiere - Share The Night (Michael Gray Extended Remix)
- 2022 Rick Assessment - Dance With Me (Michael Gray Remix)
- 2022 Komiko - Feel Alright (Dr Packer & Michael Gray Remix)
- 2022 BB&Q Band - Dreamer (Michael Gray Remix)
- 2022 Robin S - I Believe (Michael Gray & Mark Knight Remix)
- 2023 Mystic Merlin - Just Can't Give You Up (Michael Gray Remix)
- 2023 Donna Allen - Serious (Michael Gray Remix)
- 2023 Spiritchaser feat. Dyanna Fearon - Tonight (Michael Gray Remix)
- 2023 B. B. & Q. Band - Genie (Michael Gray Extended Remix)
- 2023 Central Line - Don't Tell Me (Dr. Packer & Michael Gray Remix)
- 2023 Artful & Ridney ft Terri Walker - Missing You (Michael Gray Remix)
- 2023 Ten City - That's The Way Love Is (Michael Gray Remix)
- 2024 Raw Silk - Do It To The Music (Michael Gray Extended Remix)
- 2024 Jamiroquai – Space Cowboy (Good Vibe Zone) [Edit, Dub, and Extended Mix]
- 2024 Unlimited Touch - I Hear Music In The Streets (Michael Gray Remix)
- 2024 Fred Kingdom - Lost In The Rythmn (Michael Gray House Mix)
- 2024 Inner Life & Jocelyn Brown - I Like It Like That (Michael Gray Extended Remix)
- 2025 Voyage - From East to West (Michael Gray Remix)
- 2025 Light of the World - Time (Michael Gray Remix)
- 2025 The B.B. & Q. Band - On the Beat (Michael Gray Remix)
- 2025 Change, Tanya Michelle Smith - Sunrise Forever (Michael Gray Remixes)
- 2025 Gwen Dickey, Michael Gray - If I'm Gonna Be With You (Michael Gray Extended Mix)
- 2025 Revival House Project, Phebe Edwards, GeO Gospel Choir - Think (Michael Gray Extended Remix)
- 2025 Dave & Maurissa - What About My Love (Michael Gray Extended Remix)
- 2026 Danny Kane & Colonel Red - Don’t You Worry (Michael Gray Extended Mix)
