= Alisha's Attic =

English pop duo

- Shelly (left) and Karen (right)

Background information
- Origin: London, England
- Genres: Pop, pop rock
- Years active: 1996–2001
- Labels: Universal, Mercury
- Past members: Shelly Poole; Karen Poole

Alisha's Attic were an English pop duo of the 1990s and early 2000s. The two members were sisters Shelly and Karen Poole, born in Barking and Chadwell Heath respectively. Their father is Brian Poole of 1960s group Brian Poole and the Tremeloes.

== History ==
=== 1988: Karen and Shelly ===
Karen and Shelly released their first single, "Sugar Daddy", as Keren & Chelle [sic] in 1988, reaching No.167.

=== 1996: Alisha's Attic ===
In July 1996, Alisha's Attic released their debut single "I Am, I Feel", which quickly became a radio and chart hit in the UK. This was followed in November 1996 by their debut album Alisha Rules the World., produced by Dave Stewart of Eurythmics, and it spawned four top 15 UK hits. They were nominated for Brit Award for Best New Artist at the Brit Awards 1997 In July 1997, the band played at the first Lilith Fair festival.

In October 1998, Alisha's Attic released their second album Illumina, which produced the singles "The Incidentals", "Wish I Were You" and "Barbarella".

A third album The House We Built was released in 2001. The two singles from this album were "Pretender Got My Heart" (which was featured in the film Bridget Jones's Diary) and "Push It All Aside". Alisha's Attic split in 2001.

Both members went on to become successful songwriters, writing for artists such as Kylie Minogue, Dannii Minogue, Will Young, and Sugababes. Shelly is also in the band Red Sky July.

== Discography ==
Alisha's Attic discography
- Studio albums: 3
- Extended plays: 1
- Compilation albums: 2
- Singles: 9

=== Studio albums ===
Title	Album details	Peak chart positions				Certifications
Title	Album details	UK	AUS	GER	SCO	Certifications
Alisha Rules the World	Released: November 1996; Label: Mercury	14	54	58	29	UK: Platinum
Illumina	Released: October 1998; Label: Mercury	15	—	—	31	UK: Silver
The House We Built	Released: July 2001; Label: Mercury	55	—	—	90	
"—" denotes items that did not chart or were not released in that territory.

=== Compilation albums ===
Title	Album details
The Collection	Released: July 2003; Label: Spectrum Music
The Attic Vaults I	Released: August 2001; Fan club release only

=== Extended plays ===
Title	EP details
Japanese Dream	Released: 1997 (Japan only); Label: Mercury

=== Singles ===
Year	Title	Peak chart positions							Certifications	Album
Year	Title	UK	AUS	FRA	GER	IRE	SCO	SWE	Certifications	Album
1996	"I Am, I Feel"	14	18	40	69	13	14	23	UK: Silver; AUS: Gold	Alisha Rules the World
1996	"Alisha Rules the World"	12	26	—	69	24	16	60		Alisha Rules the World
1997	"Indestructible"	12	128	—	—	—	13	—		Alisha Rules the World
1997	"Air We Breathe"	12	—	—	—	—	13	—		Alisha Rules the World
1998	"The Incidentals"	13	—	—	—	—	14	—		Illumina
1998	"Wish I Were You"	29	—	—	—	—	27	—		Illumina
1999	"Barbarella"	34	—	—	—	—	30	—		Illumina
2001	"Push It All Aside"	24	—	—	—	—	17	—		The House We Built
2001	"Pretender Got My Heart"	43	—	—	—	—	51	—		The House We Built
"—" denotes items that did not chart or were not released in that territory.

=== Other songs ===
- A cover version of Suede's "Still Life" for the 1996 charity album by ChildLine.
- A cover of The Crystals' "He's a Rebel" for the 1997 film Bean.
