= Let's Get Down (Supafly song) =

Single by Supafly vs. Fishbowl
- Released: 18 August 2005
- Genre: House
- Length: 3:08
- Label: Universal Music
- Songwriter(s): Panos Liassi; Andrew Tumi; Christos Papathanasiou

Supafly singles chronology
"Erotic City" (2003)	"Let's Get Down" (2005)	"Moving Too Fast" (2006)

"Let's Get Down" is a song by British electronic duo Supafly vs. Fishbowl. It was released in August 2005 as a single and reached the top 30 in the UK and Australia.

== Chart positions ==
Chart (2005–06)	Peak position
Australia (ARIA)	30
Belgium (Ultratop 50 Flanders)	48
Belgium (Ultratip Bubbling Under Wallonia)	16
France (SNEP)	44
Hungary (Dance Top 40)	8
Netherlands (Dutch Top 40)	13
Scotland (OCC)	28
UK Dance (OCC)	3
UK Singles (OCC)	22
