= Blazing Away =

Live album by Marianne Faithfull
- Released: 1990
- Recorded: September 1988, RPM Studios, NYC (track 11); November 25 & 26, 1989, St. Anne's Cathedral, Brooklyn, New York
- Genre: Torch song
- Length: 71:17
- Label: Island 842 794
- Producer: Hal Willner

Marianne Faithfull chronology
Strange Weather (1987)	Blazing Away (1990)	A Secret Life (1995)

Singles from Blazing Away
- 1. "The Ballad of Lucy Jordan" Released: 1990; 2. "Blazing Away" Released: 1990; 3. "Times Square (South Africa only)" Released: 1990

Blazing Away is a live album by British singer Marianne Faithfull, released on the Island label in 1990.

== Reception ==
Professional ratings
Review scores
Source	Rating
Allmusic	4/5 stars

In his review for Allmusic, Ned Raggett notes that "Fully established as a dramatic, innovative singer with astonishing appeal and energy thanks to her string of excellent '80s releases, Faithfull concluded her renaissance decade with Blazing Away, an excellent live album... Faithfull and the players fit hand in glove track for track, with the emphasis on subtler arrangements and performances suiting the hushed, striking atmosphere of the performance".

== Track listing ==
1. "Les Prisons du Roi" (Michel Rivgauche, Irving Gordon) – 6:46
2. "Strange Weather" (Kathleen Brennan, Tom Waits) – 5:12
3. "Guilt" (Barry Reynolds) – 7:51
4. "Working Class Hero" (John Lennon) – 6:07
5. "Sister Morphine" (Marianne Faithfull, Mick Jagger, Keith Richards) – 7:25
6. "As Tears Go By" (Jagger, Andrew Loog Oldham, Richards) – 4:25
7. "Why'd Ya Do It?" (Faithfull, Reynolds, Terry Stannard, Heathcote Williams, Steve York) – 6:31
8. "When I Find My Life" (Faithfull, Reynolds) – 2:59
9. "The Ballad of Lucy Jordan" (Shel Silverstein) – 5:08
10. "Times Square" (Reynolds, Faithfull) – 4:57
11. "Blazing Away" (Faithfull, Reynolds) – 4:10
12. "She Moved Through the Fair" (Traditional; arranged by Marianne Faithfull) – 2:09
13. "Broken English" (Faithfull, Joe Maverty, Reynolds, Stannard, York) – 7:37

=== Track listing of concert ===
1. "Les Prisons du Roi"
2. "Falling from Grace"
3. "The Blue Millionaire"
4. "Strange Weather"
5. "Guilt"
6. "Sister Morphine"
7. "Working Class Hero"
8. "When I Find My Life"
9. "The Ballad of Lucy Jordan"
10. "As Tears Go By"
11. "Why D'Ya Do It?"
12. "Boulevard of Broken Dreams"
13. "Broken English"
14. "Times Square"

== Personnel ==
- Marianne Faithfull – vocals
- Barry Reynolds – guitar, backing vocals (tracks 1–10, 12 & 13), musical director, associate producer
- Marc Ribot – guitar (tracks 1–10, 12 & 13)
- Garth Hudson – keyboards, accordion (tracks 1–10, 12 & 13)
- Lew Soloff – trumpet, flugelhorn (tracks 1–10, 12 & 13)
- Mac Rebennack – piano (track 10)
- Fernando Saunders – bass, backing vocals, guitar
- Dougie Bowne (tracks 1–10, 12 & 13), Charley Drayton (track 11) – drums
- Kevin Savanger – keyboards (track 11)
- Don Alias – percussion (track 11)
- Gib Wharton – pedal steel guitar (track 11)
- Nelson Stump – cowbell, kick drum (track 14)

Technical

- Kevin Patrick – executive producer
- Joe Ferla – engineer, mixing
- Tony Wright – art direction, cover artwork
- Dana Shimizu – design
- George DuBose – cover photography

== Charts ==
Chart	Peak position
Australian Albums Chart	66
Austrian Albums (Ö3 Austria)	28
New Zealand Albums Chart	19
Swedish Albums Chart	44
US Billboard 200	160
Dutch Albums (Album Top 100)	75
