= Rich Kid Blues =

Studio album by Marianne Faithfull
- Released: 1985
- Recorded: 1971
- Studio: Trident Studios, London
- Genre: Pop, folk, country
- Length: 40:24
- Label: Castle Communications
- Producer: Mike Leander

Marianne Faithfull chronology
| A Child's Adventure (1983) | Rich Kid Blues (1985) | Strange Weather (1987) |

Rich Kid Blues is a studio album by British singer Marianne Faithfull, recorded in 1971 under the title Masques and first released in 1985.

== Overview ==
The album was produced by Mike Leander, who had worked with Faithfull in the 1960s. Leander hoped to place the album with Bell Records but, despite some initial positive feedback, Bell rejected the record after it was completed. The 12 songs were cut at these 1971 sessions and, after the success of her 1979 Broken English album, was first released in 1985 on the Castle Communications compilation album Rich Kid Blues, which added most of the material from her 1978 album Faithless. Background to the album is provided on the Faithfull Forever website.

== Releases ==
Recorded in 1971, the album was first released in 1985 on the Castle Communications compilation album (2-LP set) Rich Kid Blues, which added most of the material from her 1978 album Faithless (The 1978 Faithless album was mostly a reissue of her 1976 Dreamin' My Dreams album)

Issued on CD in 1998 by Diablo Records, a subsidiary of the Demon Music Group

Issued on CD in 2000 as True: The Collection on Music Club Records, UK

Issued on CD in 2002 by Edsel Records, UK

CD version An Introduction to Marianne Faithfull (Universal Records 620638044520) Canada 2006.

Issued in a limited edition on vinyl on Record Store Day April 22, 2017 by Demon Records

Demon has reissued the album again in July 2018

== Track listing ==
1. "Rich Kid Blues" (Terry Reid) – 4:17
2. "Long Black Veil" (Danny Dill, Marijohn Wilkin) – 3:00
3. "Sad Lisa" (Cat Stevens) – 2:28
4. "It's All Over Now, Baby Blue" (Bob Dylan) – 3:50
5. "Southern Butterfly" (Tim Hardin) – 3:16
6. "Chords of Fame" (Phil Ochs) – 3:46
7. "Visions of Johanna" (Bob Dylan) – 4:36
8. "It Takes a Lot to Laugh, It Takes a Train to Cry" (Bob Dylan) – 3:54
9. "Beware of Darkness" (George Harrison) – 3:30
10. "Corinna, Corinna" (Bo Chatman, J. Mayo Williams, Mitchell Parish) – 2:32
11. "Mud Slide Slim" (James Taylor) – 3:38
12. "Crazy Lady Blues" (Sandy Denny) – 2:04
