= A Child's Adventure =

Studio album by Marianne Faithfull
- Released: March 1983
- Recorded: 1982
- Length: 37:20
- Label: Island
- Producer: Wally Badarou, Harvey Goldberg, Barry Reynolds

Marianne Faithfull chronology
Dangerous Acquaintances (1981)	A Child's Adventure (1983)	Rich Kid Blues (1985)

Singles from A Child’s Adventure
- 1. "Running For Our Lives" Released: March 1983; 2. "Blue Millionaire" Released: 1983; 3. "Times Square" Released: 1983

Professional ratings
Review scores
Source	Rating
AllMusic	2/5 stars

A Child's Adventure is the ninth studio album by British singer Marianne Faithfull, released on Island Records in 1983.

== Background and recording ==
After two albums with Mark Mundy as producer, Marianne Faithfull recorded A Child's Adventure without a separate producer; the album was produced by backing musicians Wally Badarou and Barry Reynolds and engineer Harvey Goldberg. In an interview following the album's recording, she remarked, "On this album, because we didn't have a producer as such, we could really work closely together on the finer bits - the harmonics, which a producer often doesn't have the time for."

Faithfull had been performing "She's Got a Problem", a poem written by Caroline Blackwood and put to music by Faithfull's then-husband Ben Brierley, since 1978.

== Track listing ==
No.	Title	Writer(s)	Length
1.	"Times Square"	Barry Reynolds	4:22
2.	"The Blue Millionaire"	Wally Badarou, Marianne Faithfull, Barry Reynolds	5:35
3.	"Falling from Grace"	Ben Brierley, Faithfull	3:56
4.	"Morning Come"	Wally Badarou, Faithfull	5:16
5.	"Ashes in My Hand"	Faithfull, Barry Reynolds	4:51
6.	"Running for Our Lives"	Wally Badarou, Faithfull, Barry Reynolds	4:48
7.	"Ireland"	Faithfull, Barry Reynolds	4:37
8.	"She's Got a Problem"	Caroline Blackwood, Ben Brierley	3:55

== Personnel ==
- Marianne Faithfull – vocals
- Barry Reynolds – vocals, guitar
- Ben Brierley – vocals, guitar
- Wally Badarou – vocals, keyboards
- Mikey Chung – guitar
- Fernando Saunders – bass
- Terry Stannard – drums
- Rafael de Jesus – percussion

== Charts ==
Chart (1983)	Peak position
Dutch Albums (Album Top 100)	43
New Zealand Albums (RMNZ)	15
Norwegian Albums (VG-lista)	16
Swedish Albums (Sverigetopplistan)	9
Canada Top Albums/CDs (RPM)	42
US Billboard 200	107
Australian Albums (Kent Music Report)	14
UK Albums (OCC)	99
German Albums (Offizielle Top 100)	60

== Certifications ==
Region	Certification	Certified units/sales
Australia (ARIA)	Gold	35,000^{^}
^{^} Shipments figures based on certification alone.
