= Faithfull: An Autobiography =

1994 autobiography by Marianne Faithfull

- Front cover of Faithfull: An Autobiography
- Author: Marianne Faithfull and David Dalton
- Language: English
- Genre: Autobiography
- Publisher: Little, Brown and Company
- Publication date: 1 August 1994
- Publication place: United States
- Media type: Print (hardcover and paperback)
- Pages: 310
- ISBN: 9780316273244

Faithfull: An Autobiography is an autobiography by British singer Marianne Faithfull, written in collaboration with David Dalton. It was first published on 1 August 1994 by Little, Brown and Company and reissued as a paperback in July 1995. The book was also accompanied by the release of a compilation album Faithfull: A Collection of Her Best Recordings (1994). Faithfull: An Autobiography chronicles her childhood, career as a teenage pop star during the 1960s, relationship with Mick Jagger, heroin addiction in the 1970s, and her comeback to music industry with her album Broken English (1979).

== Critical response ==
The book received generally positive reviews from critics. David Browne in Entertainment Weekly gave the book A rating and wrote: "Most pop-music autobiographies are random notes; it's easy to believe David Crosby and Dion inhaled heavily simply because their memories are so vague. Faithfull, on the other hand, can recall most of the faces and places involved with her sundry rises and drug-sodden crashes of the last three decades." He also added that "it may be the most honest rock memoir yet published". Paul Jones from The Independent was critical. He wrote: "This is not an entertaining read. In fact, it's a while since I enjoyed a book as little as this one. It is quite absorbing, though, in a tabloid sort of way - sensational and, on its subject's own admission, unreliable."

== Publication history ==
Region	Release date	Format
United States	1 August 1994	Hardcover
United States	1 July 1995	Paperback
United States	6 June 2000	Paperback
United States	19 May 2014	E-book
United Kingdom	8 August 1994	Hardcover
United Kingdom	1 July 1995	Paperback
