= Love in a mist =

Love in a Mist or Love in a mist may refer to:

- Nigella damascena, a plant commonly known as Love in a mist
- Love in a Mist (album), a 1967 album by Marianne Faithful
- Love in a Mist (play), a 1941 comedy play by Kenneth Horne
