= Does the Noise in My Head Bother You? A Rock 'n' Roll Memoir =

2011 memoir by Steven Tyler and David Dalton

- Author: Steven Tyler and David Dalton
- Genre: Memoir
- Publisher: HarperCollins
- Publication date: May 3, 2011
- Publication place: United States
- Pages: 390
- ISBN: 978-0007319183

Does the Noise in My Head Bother You? A Rock 'n' Roll Memoir is a memoir by American singer and Aerosmith frontman Steven Tyler and David Dalton, published on May 3, 2011 by HarperCollins. It talks about Tyler's life as the frontman for Aerosmith, his fame journey, struggles with drugs, and the rock and roll lifestyle, and ends at his American Idol gig.

== Publication ==
Does the Noise in My Head Bother You? A Rock 'n' Roll Memoir was published on May 3, 2011 by HarperCollins, and reached number 3 on the Combined Print & E-Book Nonfiction list, number 2 on Hardcover Nonfiction and number 3 on E-Book Nonfiction on the New York Times list of best sellers for the week of May 22, 2011.

== Critical reception ==
Entertainment Weekly critic Clark Collis states: "Tyler really does seem to have succeeded in mainlining the noisome contents of his noggin directly onto the page (with assistance from co-writer David Dalton). At one point the singer expresses his preference for a 'f—ed?up' voice with a 'ton of character.' While that may or may not prove useful to American Idol contestants, it is certainly a fair description of the authorial tone to be found here.", rating it a B+. The Hollywood Reporter writer Andy Lewis concludes that "What on the surface seems cliched, almost a parody of a rock memoir, manages somehow to rise above that and be a fun ride. And pulling off that trick, ladies and gentlemen, is what separates a Rock Star from a merely ordinary pop star." The New York Times author Rob Sheffield notes that it "chronicles one of the music world’s strangest careers, in an appropriately dazed tone.", adding that "All through the book, Tyler provides insights into the medical condition known as L.S.D., or “Lead Singer Disease” — it’s practically an Oliver Sacks-level investigation into L.S.D., from the perspective of a prize case study.", he ends his review by noting that "The last time Tyler told his tale, in Aerosmith’s 1997 oral history, “Walk This Way,” there was a happy ending: sobriety, marriage, hit records. This time around, things are different." and "it’s oddly touching that despite everything, through all the chaos, Tyler’s ego remains unkillable." The Washington Post writer Fiona Zublin states: "Tyler's psychobabble is truly offensive only when it comes to his ideas on gender. In one chapter, he seems to argue that groupies are part of a rock star’s lot in life and that it was unfair for his wives and girlfriends to object to his on-the-road extramarital activities", adding that "It’s a rambling story that leaps from incident to incident, rarely explaining the chronology of events and sometimes leaving off endings. You’re never sure whom he was married to when, or which rehab stint is which. Being a rock star is apparently exactly how you’ve always imagined it: occasional moments of musical clarity stuffed in the cracks around screaming fights with band members and girlfriends and moments of drug-fueled epiphany."

== Use in sexual assault lawsuit ==
During the sexual assault lawsuit in 2023, Tyler proclaimed his lawyer couldn't use Does the Noise in My Head Bother You? against him.
