= A Secret Life (album) =

Studio album by Marianne Faithfull
- Released: 21 March 1995
- Recorded: 1994
- Studios: Excalibur Sound; National/Edison Recording Studio; (New York City)
- Genres: Alternative rock; art rock
- Length: 35:00
- Label: Island
- Producer: Angelo Badalamenti

Marianne Faithfull chronology
Blazing Away (1990)	A Secret Life (1995)	20th Century Blues (1997)

Singles from A Secret Life
- 1. "Bored by Dreams" Released: 1995

A Secret Life is the twelfth studio album by English singer Marianne Faithfull. It was released on 21 March 1995 by Island Records. The album marked her first studio release composed mostly of original material in over a decade. Faithfull collaborated with American composer Angelo Badalamenti after his work on the television series Twin Peaks. Influenced by her interest in classical music, A Secret Life was a musical departure from her previous work and displayed a more tender side to her voice.

Faithfull also worked with Irish poet and her longtime friend Frank McGuinness and used some of his poems in the songs "Sleep" and "The Wedding". Musically, A Secret Life is an alternative rock album which was inspired by classical music and also incorporates elements of blues. The songs deal with themes such as broken relationship on "She" or secret love affair on "Love in the Afternoon".

A Secret Life received mixed reviews from music critics. Released only months after her successful autobiography Faithfull: An Autobiography and compilation album Faithfull: A Collection of Her Best Recordings (1994), the album was a commercial failure. "Bored by Dreams" was the only single released from the album and also failed to chart.

== Critical reception ==
Professional ratings
Review scores
Source	Rating
AllMusic	3/5 stars
Billboard	(positive)
Robert Christgau	(neither)
Entertainment Weekly	B
NME	3/10
Spin	4/10

A Secret Life received generally mixed reviews from music critics. Richie Unterberger at AllMusic claimed that "Faithfull is still in rippingly fine voice, and her words still penetrate". However, he criticized Badalamenti's orchestral arrangements and noted that "while they can be effectively noirish, they can also create an inappropriately cold and detached ambience". He described the songs "Flaming September" and "She" as standout tracks.

== Track listing ==
No.	Title	Writer(s)	Length
1.	"Prologue"	Angelo Badalamenti; Dante Alighieri	2:03
2.	"Sleep"	Marianne Faithfull; Badalamenti; Frank McGuinness	3:43
3.	"Love in the Afternoon"	Faithfull; Badalamenti	3:30
4.	"Flaming September"	Faithfull; Badalamenti	5:01
5.	"She"	Faithfull; Badalamenti	3:24
6.	"Bored by Dreams"	Faithfull; Badalamenti	3:08
7.	"Losing"	Badalamenti; David Foreman; Duke Levine	3:52
8.	"The Wedding"	Faithfull; Badalamenti; McGuinness	3:16
9.	"The Stars Line Up"	Faithfull; Badalamenti	3:51
10.	"Epilogue"	Badalamenti; William Shakespeare	3:12
Total length:			35:00

Notes

- "Prologue" contains an interpolation of Divine Comedy by Dante Alighieri.
- "Epilogue" contains an interpolation of The Tempest by William Shakespeare.

== Personnel ==
- Marianne Faithfull – vocals
- Carmine D'Amico – guitar
- Vinnie Bell – guitar, mandolin
- Gene Orloff – violin
- Alfred Brown, Julien Barber, Lamar Alsop, Ann Barak, Mitsue Takayama, Ken Fricker, Juliet Haffner, Harry Zaratzian – viola
- Fred Zlotkin, Clay Ruede, Beverly Lauridsen, Julie Green – cello
- Albert Regni, Pamela Sklar, Lawrence Feldman – flute, alto flute
- Shelly Woodworth, Sherry Sylar – oboe, oboe d'amore
- Andre Badalamenti – clarinet
- Bob Carlisle – French horn
- Kinny Landrum, Angelo Badalamenti – keyboards
- Rufus Reid, Mark Egan, Rob Devito – bass
- Sammy Merendino, Gordon Gottlieb – drums, percussion

Technical

- Gary Chester – string and woodwind recording, mixing
- Art Polhemus – vocal and rhythm track recording
- Tony Wright – art direction
- Aldo Sampieri – design
- Michel Comte, Wayne Maser – photography
