= Dangerous Acquaintances =

Studio album by Marianne Faithfull
- Released: 1 September 1981
- Recorded: March 1981
- Studios: Matrix Studios (London, United Kingdom)
- Genres: Rock; disco
- Length: 36:44
- Label: Island
- Producer: Mark Miller Mundy

Marianne Faithfull chronology
Broken English (1979)	Dangerous Acquaintances (1981)	A Child's Adventure (1983)

Singles from Dangerous Acquaintances
- 1. "Intrigue" Released: September 1981; 2. "Sweetheart" Released: 30 September 1981; 3. "Truth, Bitter Truth" Released: 1981; 4. "Tenderness" Released: 13 January 1982; 5. "For Beautie’s Sake" Released: 25 May 1982

Dangerous Acquaintances is the eighth studio album by English singer Marianne Faithfull. It was released on 1 September 1981 by Island Records. The album was seen by reviewers as a disappointing follow-up to Faithfull's Broken English, as the album trades the angry and controversial alternative new wave arrangements of the previous one for a more mainstream rock texture, using over a dozen session musicians and, for some, giving a certain anonymous feel to the songs. The title is a reference to the Pierre Choderlos de Laclos 1782 novel Les Liaisons dangereuses.

The main singles of the album were "Intrigue", penned by the singer's then-husband, Ben Brierley, and "For Beauty's Sake", written by Faithfull and Steve Winwood.

== Background and recording ==
Marianne Faithfull described the album's recording as a long and arduous process, marked by numerous instances of miscommunication between herself, the instrumentalists, and the producer. She particularly commented that bassist Steve York and drummer Terry Stannard did not gel properly, and that producer Mark Mundy made inappropriate production decisions, such as the inclusion of horns on "Intrigue". She was also unhappy with the way Mundy interacted with the performers: "We went through some amazing scenes. He was treating the band like they couldn't play and didn't know what they were doing – and in a way, me too, but particularly the band. It was a divide and conquer trip. I don't think he meant to do it. He just did it naturally."

== Critical reception ==
Professional ratings
Review scores
Source	Rating
AllMusic	3/5 stars
People	(favourable)
Record Mirror	4/5 stars
The Village Voice	B+

In their retrospective review, AllMusic's Richie Unterberger criticized the album for backing down from the musical and lyrical boldness of Broken English in favor of more conventional and accessible material, though he did state that there was "at least one commercially viable track", in "For Beauty's Sake" (a Faithfull–Steve Winwood co-write).

== Track listing ==
No.	Title	Writer(s)	Length
1.	"Sweetheart"	Marianne Faithfull; Barry Reynolds	3:15
2.	"Intrigue"	Ben Brierley	4:29
3.	"Easy in the City"	Faithfull; Barry Reynolds	3:16
4.	"Strange One"	Joe Mavety; Terry Stannard	2:51
5.	"Tenderness"	Faithfull; Barry Reynolds	3:53
6.	"For Beauty's Sake"	Faithfull; Steve Winwood	3:30
7.	"So Sad"	Faithfull; Barry Reynolds; Steve York	4:31
8.	"Eye Communication"	Faithfull; Barry Reynolds; Calvin Samuel; Terry Stannard	3:35
9.	"Truth, Bitter Truth"	David Courts; Faithfull; Barry Reynolds	7:24
Total length:			36:44

== Personnel ==
- Marianne Faithfull – vocals
- Barry Reynolds – guitar
- Steve York – bass
- Joe Maverty – guitar
- Terry Stannard – drums

with:

- Steve Winwood – keyboards
- Frank Collins – backing vocals
- Denis Haines – keyboards
- Pickford Sykes – keyboards
- Neil Hubbard – guitar
- Martin Drover – trumpet
- Julian Diggle – percussion
- Calvin "Fuzzy" Samuel – bass
- Chris Stainton – keyboards
- Clifton "Bigga" Morrison – piano
- Dyan Spenner – backing vocals
- Jim Leverton – bass
- Mel Collins – saxophones
- Peter Veitch – keyboards

Technical

- Bob Potter – engineer
- Ed Thacker – mixing
- Paul Henry – art direction
- Clive Arrowsmith – photography

== Charts ==
=== Weekly charts ===
Chart (1981)	Peak position
Australian Kent Music Report Albums Chart	24
Canadian RPM Albums Chart	12
Dutch Mega Albums Chart	33
French SNEP Albums Chart	10
New Zealand Albums Chart	7
Norwegian VG-lista Albums Chart	12
Swedish Albums Chart	4
UK Albums Chart	45
U.S. Billboard 200	104

=== Year-end charts ===
Chart (1981)	Position
Canadian Albums Chart	76

== Certifications and sales ==
Region	Certification	Certified units/sales
Australia (ARIA)	Gold	35,000^{^}
Canada (Music Canada)	Gold	50,000^{^}
France (SNEP)	Gold	100,000^{*}
New Zealand (RMNZ)	Gold	7,500^{^}
^{*} Sales figures based on certification alone.^{^} Shipments figures based on certification alone.
