= Strange Weather (Marianne Faithfull album) =

Studio album by Marianne Faithfull
- Released: July 1987
- Recorded: 1987
- Studio: A&R Recording Studios, New York City; Bearsville Studios, Bearsville, New York; Record Plant Studios, New York City
- Genre: Blues, dark cabaret, rock
- Length: 38:44
- Label: Island
- Producer: Hal Willner

Marianne Faithfull chronology
Rich Kid Blues (1985)	Strange Weather (1987)	Blazing Away (1990)

Singles from Strange Weather
- 1. "As Tears Go By" Released: July 1987; 2. "Boulevard Of Broken Dreams" Released: 30 September 1987; 3. "Sign Of Judgement" Released: 1987

Professional ratings
Review scores
Source	Rating
AllMusic	4.5/5 stars
Record Mirror	4/5 stars
The Rolling Stone Album Guide	3/5 stars
The Village Voice	A−

Strange Weather is a 1987 studio album by British singer Marianne Faithfull, recorded after recovering from a 17-year addiction to heroin in 1986. The album's three predecessors on Island Records were all recorded while Faithfull confronted personal struggles, with most lyrics and some music penned by Faithfull herself. In contrast, Strange Weather is a mix of rock, blues and dark cabaret, none written by Faithfull. The album was produced by Hal Willner, with musicians including Bill Frisell. The title track became a Faithfull concert staple and has appeared live in three additional recordings.

== Overview ==
In 1985 Faithfull contributed a single track, "Ballad of the Soldier's Wife", to Lost in the Stars, a tribute to the music of Kurt Weill by various contemporary artists. In response to the success of the project and to favourable reviews for Faithfull's contribution, producer Hal Willner suggested the potential of an expanded project of classic compositions, but, according to Willner in Strange Weather's liner notes, he believed it was "one of those projects which usually never comes to fruition."

Just prior to her recovery, Faithfull began work on a new album of rock songs, but Island Records scrapped the project Instead, Willner re-entered the picture and the concept of the album of classic standards was expanded to include not only material contemporary to Weill's Weimar Republic era but a more recent song by Bob Dylan, two early folk-era spirituals, traditional piano blues with accompaniment by Dr. John (credited as Mac Rebennack), and all new material was written specifically for the project. The album’s title track was written by Tom Waits and Kathleen Brennan, and "Hello Stranger" was written by Rebennack and Doc Pomus. Faithfull also re-recorded her 1964 hit "As Tears Go By" in a markedly different arrangement, using a slower tempo and sung a full octave lower than the original.

Strange Weather failed to make it to the US Album charts (it did chart in both the UK and Australia), and never charted its only single "As Tears Go By".

== Track listing ==
1. "Stranger Intro" (Bill Frisell) – 0:31
2. "Boulevard of Broken Dreams" (Al Dubin, Harry Warren) – 3:04
3. "I Ain't Goin' Down to the Well No More" (Huddie Ledbetter, Alan Lomax, John Lomax) – 1:07
4. "Yesterdays" (Otto Harbach, Jerome Kern) – 5:20
5. "Sign of Judgement" (Kid Prince Moore) – 2:54
6. "Strange Weather" (Tom Waits, Kathleen Brennan) – 4:05
7. "Love, Life and Money" (Julius Dixon, Henry Glover) – 4:40
8. "I'll Keep It With Mine" (Bob Dylan) – 4:13
9. "Hello Stranger" (Doc Pomus, Dr. John credited as Mac Rebennack) – 2:30
10. "Penthouse Serenade" (Will Jason, Val Burton) – 2:34
11. "As Tears Go By" (Mick Jagger, Keith Richards, Andrew Loog Oldham) – 3:42
12. "A Stranger On Earth" (Sid Feller, Rick Ward) – 3:56

== Personnel ==
- Marianne Faithfull - vocals
- Bill Frisell - guitars
- Robert Quine - guitar (6, 7)
- Fernando Saunders - bass (2, 4, 6–11)
- Michael Levine - violin
- Sharon Freeman - piano (2, 8)
- Dr. John - (credited as Mac Rebennack) - piano
- Steve Slagle - alto saxophone
- Chris Hunter - alto saxophone, flute
- Lew Soloff - trumpet
- Garth Hudson - accordion
- J.T. Lewis - drums, horn arrangements
- William Schimmel - accordion
- Michael Gibbs - string arrangements

== Technical personnel ==
- Hal Willner - producer
- Joe Ferla - recording, mixing
- Tony Wright - cover and sleeve photography

== Charts ==
Chart	Peak position
Australian Kent Music Report Albums Chart	48
Canadian RPM Albums Chart	71
Dutch Mega Albums Chart	45
New Zealand Albums Chart	16
Swedish Albums Chart	32
UK Albums Chart	78
