= David Dalton (writer) =

British-born American writer (1942–2022)

John David Dalton (January 15, 1942 – July 11, 2022) was a British-born American author and a founding editor of Rolling Stone magazine. He wrote several books, including the cult classic James Dean, the Mutant King, as well as co-writing Pop: The Genius of Andy Warhol (with Tony Scherman), and collaborating with Paul Anka on the singer's autobiography, My Way.

== Early life ==
John David Dalton was born to John Dalton and Kathleen Tremaine in London on January 15, 1942. His father was a doctor and his mother was an actress. He is the first cousin of actress Joanna Pettet. Dalton was raised in London and in British Columbia, as his father was Canadian.

== Career ==
In the early 1960s, David Dalton moved to New York and began working with Warhol, helping to edit the artist's 1964 film Sleep. As a photographer, Dalton shot the Yardbirds, the Dave Clark Five, Herman’s Hermits, and other rock groups. For Rolling Stone, he wrote about Elvis Presley, Janis Joplin, Little Richard, and other musicians, and was backstage at the Rolling Stones’ infamous 1969 concert at Altamont Speedway in California. He and Rolling Stone colleague Jonathan Cott) co-authored Get Back (Apple Books, 1969), a collection of conversation transcripts (with photos by Ethan Russell) documenting the making of the film and album Let It Be.

Dalton would write twenty-four books, including biographies of Warhol, James Dean, Jim Morrison, Janis Joplin, Sid Vicious, and the Rolling Stones. He was also the co-author of the autobiography of Marianne Faithfull (Faithfull. An Autobiography, 1994) and of the autobiography of Steven Tyler, Does The Noise In My Head Bother You? (HarperCollins, 2011).

== Awards and honors ==
Dalton, along with David Felton, won the Columbia School of Journalism Award for their interview with Charles Manson. He also won the Ralph J. Gleason Best Rock Book of the Year award for his book Faithfull.

== Personal life ==
Dalton was married to the writer Coco Pekelis; they had a son and lived in Upstate New York. On July 11, 2022, Dalton died from cancer in Manhattan, at the age of 80.
