= Braziers Park =

Country house in Ipsden, Oxfordshire, England

Coordinates: 51.55465°N 1.083068°W

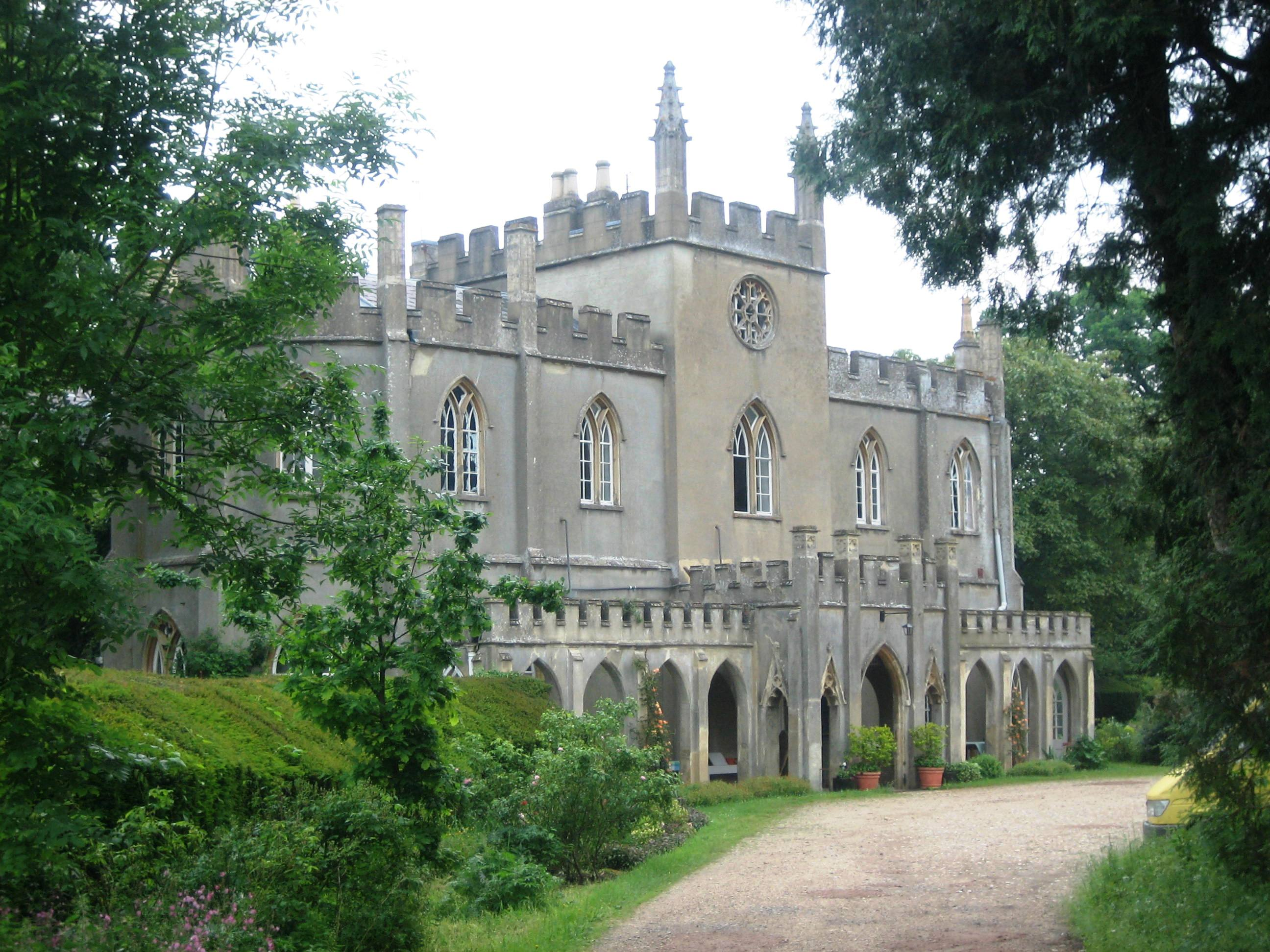
Braziers Park House

Braziers Park is a Grade II* country house and estate on the edge of Ipsden – a small village near Wallingford, Oxfordshire, England – housing a secular intentional community and the School of Integrative Social Research. It has also been used as a film location for large- and small-budget films.

The house once belonged to Valentine Fleming (father of Robert Peter Fleming and Ian Fleming), and the room that was once Ian Fleming's nursery is now a library.

== History ==
Braziers Park was built in the late 17th century (with a datestone of 1688), and modelled in the Strawberry Hill Gothic style of architecture by Daniel Harris on behalf of Isaac George Manley (1755–1837) in 1799. As a teenager, Manley had been a naval officer with Captain Cook on the first voyage of the Endeavour 1768–71; and was later Vice Admiral of the Red, and as commander of HMS Apollo captured the French corvette Legere in 1796. He was made a Rear Admiral in 1809.

In 1839, Frances Eliza (Fanny) Grenfell (1814–91), later a biographer, was living at Braziers Park with her sisters, and was visited by novelist Charles Kingsley (1819–75), then a Cambridge undergraduate. Kingsley later fictionalized this meeting as that of Argemone with Lancelot Smith in his first novel Yeast (1848). Despite Fanny having taken a vow of chastity with her sisters at Braziers Park, she and Kingsley married in Bath in 1844.

Valentine Fleming, Member of Parliament for Henley, made substantial changes to the house when he bought it in 1906. His son Ian Fleming, the novelist, briefly lived at the house when very young.

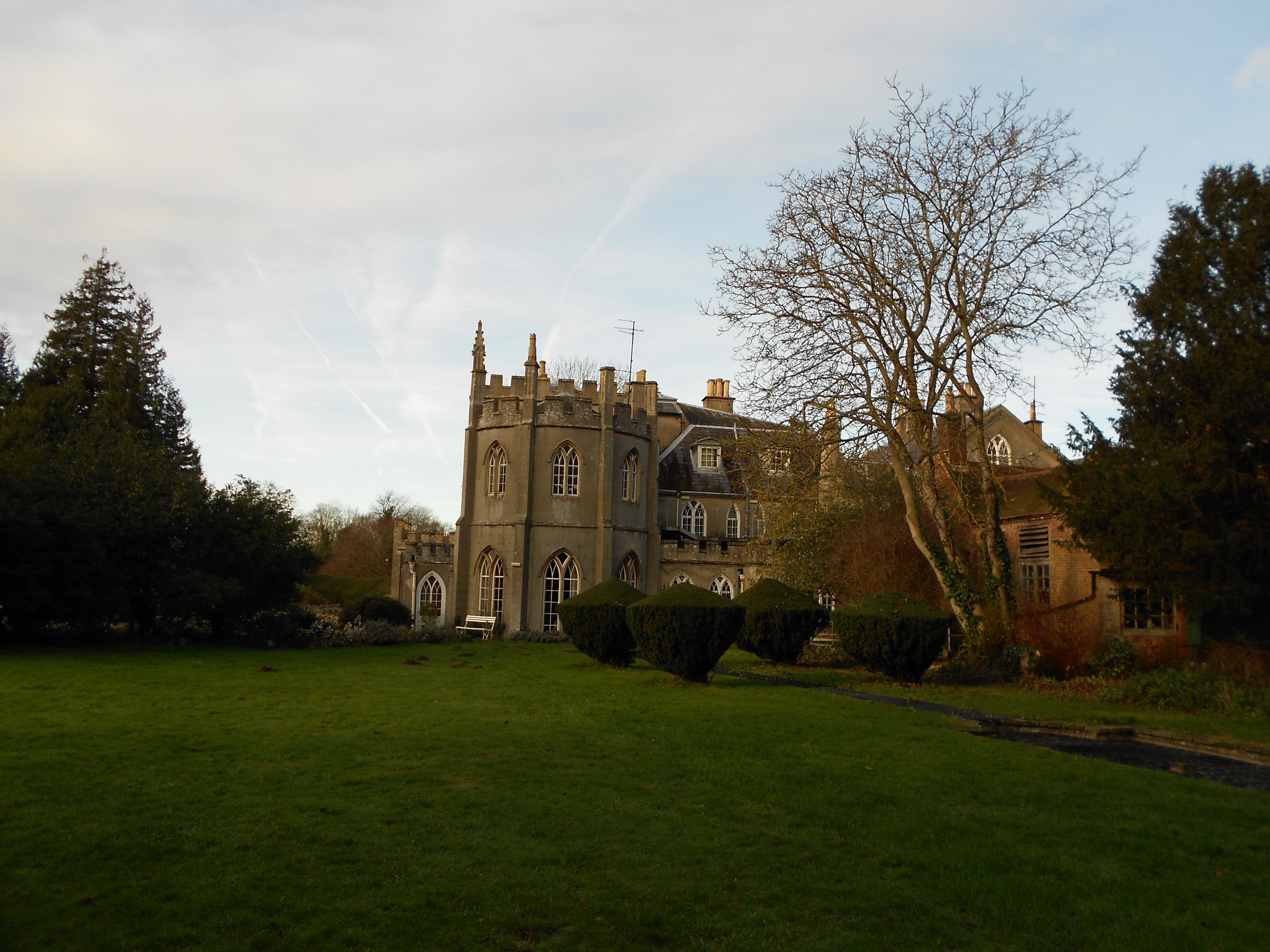
Braziers Park House (left side)

Sir Ernest Moon (1854–1930), counsel to the Speaker of the House of Commons, bought the house from Fleming in 1911, and his widow Lady Moon sold the house to Norman Glaister (1883–1961) in 1950.

Glaister set up the School of Integrative Social Research, which still exists at the site. Glaister had been involved in the Grith Fyrd barter for work system. The School, which in part functioned as a commune, aimed “to explore the dynamics of people living in groups, to develop better methods of interpersonal communication and to find new ways of combining knowledge to make it more meaningful.”

An important member of the community was Robert Glynn Faithfull (died 1996), who had met Glaister through the Order of Woodcraft Chivalry and who was viewed by the community as one of Glaister's successors. Faithfull was an academic at the University of Liverpool who studied the Italian Renaissance and had been in British espionage during the Second World War. He was married to Baroness Eva Erisso, a former ballerina. Their daughter, the singer and actress Marianne Faithfull, spent some of her early life in the community. Mick Jagger of the Rolling Stones came to stay with Marianne Faithfull at Braziers Park after his release from prison in 1967 as her then boyfriend. In her autobiography she described Braziers Park as a "mixture of high utopian thoughts and randy sex". Marianne's half-brother Simon Faithfull grew up at Braziers Park.

== Braziers Park today ==
Braziers Park is now home to around 20 people, some of whom live communally, and runs educational courses. In August 1996 the first of the annual Braziers International Artists' Workshop was held. It is the site of the annual Wood music festival that began in May 2008. Braziers is also a registered "LAND Learner" site under the UK Permaculture Association.
