= Uncle Dog =

British band

Uncle Dog is a band that released an album and single in 1972.

== Line-up ==
Members of Uncle Dog were:

- Carol Grimes - vocals
- Terry Stannard - drums, percussion
- Phillip Crooks - guitar
- Sam Mitchell - guitar
- John Porter - guitar, bass
- David Skinner - keyboards, vocals (ex-Twice as Much)
- John Pearson - drums

== Old Hat ==
Old Hat

Studio album by Uncle Dog
- Released: 1972
- Genre: Blues rock
- Label: Signpost SG 4253

Professional ratings
Review scores
Source	Rating
Allmusic	2.5/5

In 1972, the group released one album, Old Hat. Pearson played on 4 tracks and was replaced as a member by Terry Stannard who appears on the rest of the album. Guest musicians on the LP were Paul Kossoff, guitar on "We Got Time" and John 'Rabbit' Bundrick (piano). Most of the songs were penned by Dave Skinner, although there are a few covers, including Bob Dylan's "I'll Be Your Baby Tonight" (from John Wesley Harding) and Sam Phillips/Herman Parker's "Mystery Train". John Porter became a producer and produced The Smiths and John Lee Hooker's comeback album in 1989. Mitchell played with Clancy and The Sandmen. Skinner also played in Clancy and 801 while Legendary Ace Drummer Terry Stannard formed the hit band Kokomo later.

=== Album listings ===
- Album: Old Hat (Signpost SG 4253) 1972
1. "River Road"
2. "Movie Time"
3. "Old Hat"
4. "Boogie With Me"
5. "We Got Time" (featuring Paul Kossoff gtr solo)
6. "Smoke"
7. "I'll Be Your Baby Tonight" (Bob Dylan)
8. "Mystery Train" (Sam Phillips, Herman Parker)
9. "Lose Me"

== Singles released ==
- 45: "River Road" b/w "First Night" (Signpost SGP 752) 1972, #86 US Hot 100.
