= Simon Faithfull =

English artist

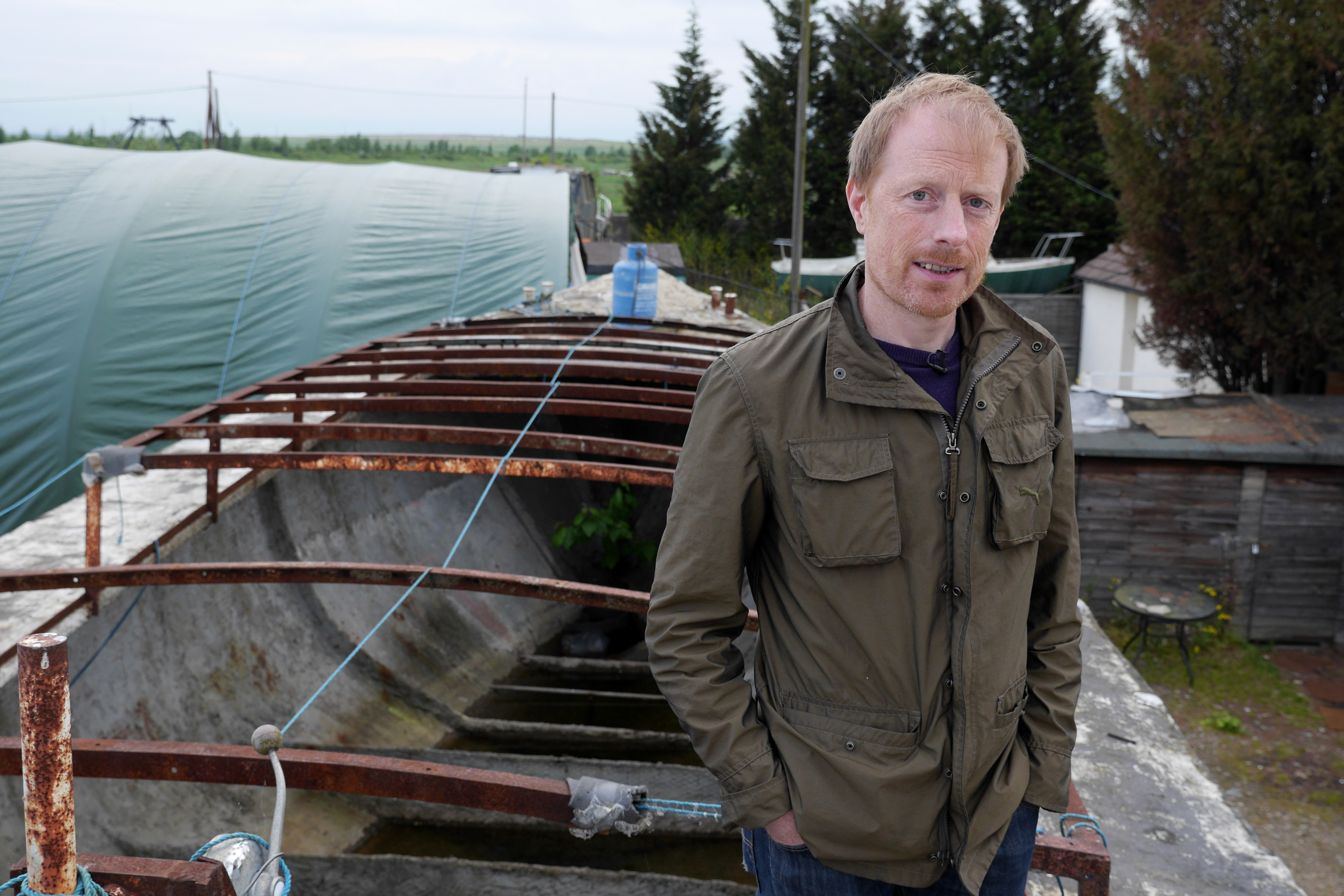
- Simon Faithfull in June 2014
- Born: 1966 (age 59–60); Ipsden, Oxfordshire, England
- Known for: Drawing, video art, sculpture

Simon Faithfull (born 1966) is an English artist based in Berlin. His work has been widely exhibited in both international solo and group exhibitions, including Kindl (Berlin) Musee des Beaux Arts (Calais), Fabrica (Brighton), FRAC Basse Normandie (France), The British Film Institute Gallery, London; Haus am Waldsee, Berlin; CRAC Alsace, France, Stills, Edinburgh; and the 52nd Venice Biennale in 2007 as part of ArtSway's New Forest Pavilion.

== Biography ==
Faithfull grew up at Braziers Park, the son of Major Robert Glynn Faithfull (1912–1998) and his second wife, Margaret Elizabeth (Kipps) Faithfull, whom he had married in 1963. He was a half brother to singer and actress Marianne Faithfull through his father's first marriage.

He was the first visual artist to receive an Arts Council England Fellowship to travel to Antarctica with the British Antarctic Survey. The journey began in November 2004 and lasted for two months. During this journey, Faithfull made daily drawings on a PalmPilot recording the daily events and sights of a journey ever further south. As with other drawing projects, these sketches were then relayed back to the world via email. In this case 3,000 people around the world received a live drawn message from end of the world.

"The drawings are very restricted in their detail because of the tiny screen with its paltry number of pixels. But I like this discipline of making something meaningful with such reduced means, something akin to an economy of line."

— Simon Faithfull

Since 2000, Faithfull abandoned paper

"in favour of pure line (or at least pure pixel) as a means to allow the lines of observational sketches to float free of their 'ground'."

He now makes his drawings using a bespoke iPhone app, Limbo.

Faithfull's practice often involves elements of failure and anti-heroism. His works revolve around research and experiments, and during the course of the past few years he has become known for his Lecture Performances that will often accompany his exhibitions. He is cited as trying to measure the world in order to check whether it exists and whether, when absent, he also still exists.

Journeys and traveling are central to his practice, whether it involves the end of the world, outer space, or a simple bike ride, they offer crucial material for Faithfull. Influences include Smithson and Richard Long.

In 2006, Faithfull released LOST (as part of a Whitstable Biennale 2006 commission), a book that catalogues the objects lost by the artist during the course of his lifetime, alongside the stories that accompany these losses. 500 of the books were left around Whitstable as part of an ongoing web project, as their finders are encouraged to record their discoveries before re-releasing them back into the world.

In a series of experiments conducted over ten years (1995–2005), Faithfull sought to defy gravity with his 'Escape vehicles'. Seven in total to date, these Escape Vehicles range from the use of balloons, chairs, insects, and rockets. Escape Vehicle no.6 saw a domestic chair travel from the Earth to the edge of space. An audience first witnessed the chair, tethered beneath a weather balloon, disappear into the sky and then watched a live video transmission from the vehicle showing the chair reaching an altitude of 30 km high. Seen against the blackness of space and the curvature of the Earth the chair finally broke up at the edge of space.

Since 2003, Faithfull has lectured at the Slade School of Fine Art. and is currently Reader in Fine Art.

Simon Faithfull is represented by Galerie Polaris, Paris.

== Notable artworks ==
=== REEF, 2014 ===
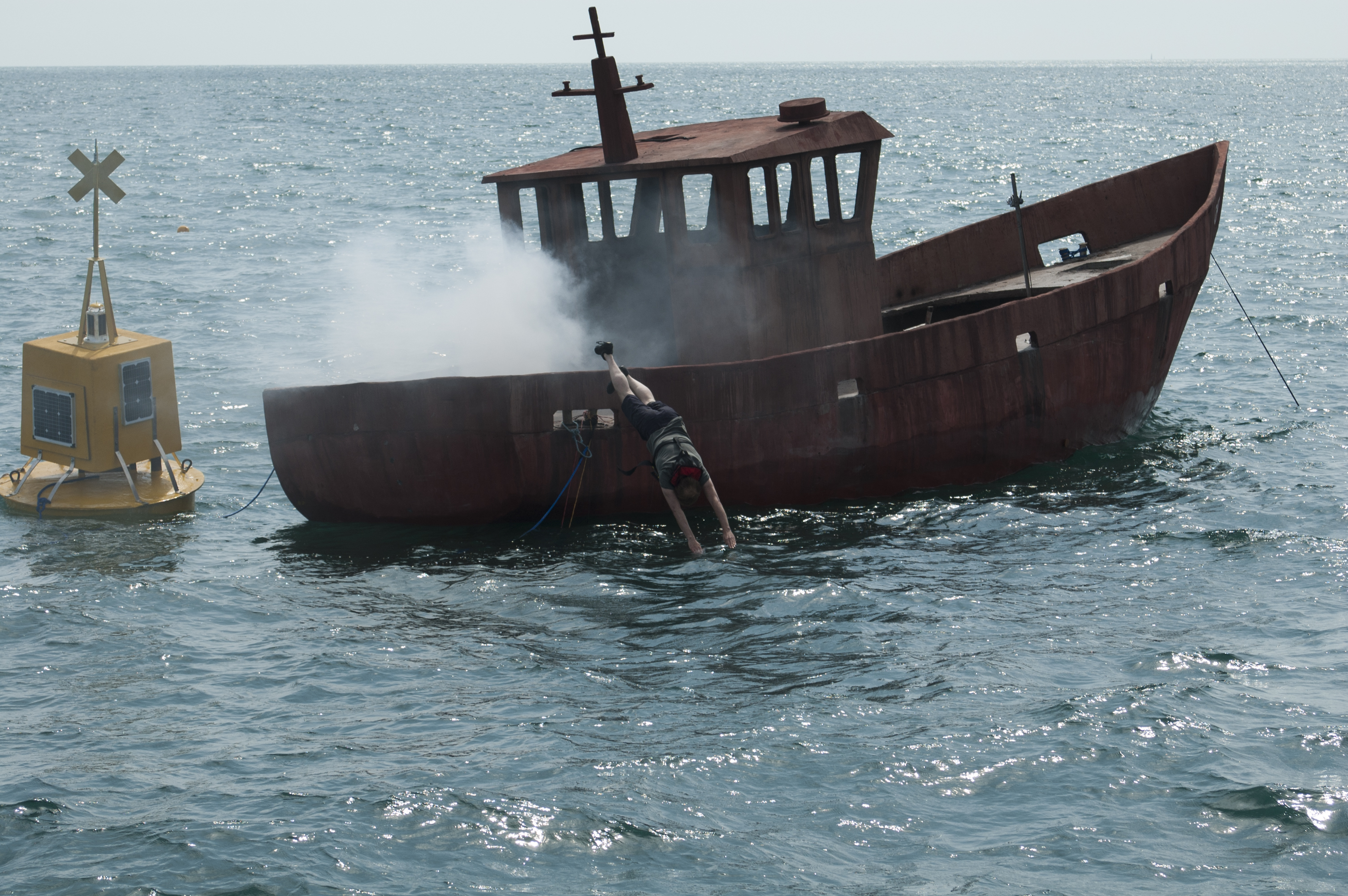
REEF (2014). Sinking the Brioney Victoria. Image courtesy of Weber Industries.

Reef saw Faithfull intentionally sink a boat called the Brioney Victoria off the coast of Southwest England. The boat was scuttled as a live event on 4 August 2014 with five cameras mounted onboard transmitting a live video stream of the boat making its final journey to the bottom of the sea. The video-work created from this event uses footage from these 5 cameras and documentation from a number of other vantage points, to tell the story of a process of transformation. The film presents the very beginning of a slow metamorphosis from defunct vessel at the end of its life, to the creation of an artificial reef – a process that will take further hundreds or even thousands of years to complete.

=== EZY1899: Reenactment for a Future Scenario ===
This film depicts the Sisyphean efforts of a silver-suited commuter to board and fly in a monstrous rendition of a 1990s jet. The unreal vehicle is misshapen, blackened by fire and missing a wing, the craft will not fly, but the traveller undertakes his ritual of boarding and waiting for take-off whilst flames surround him. The work was commissioned by Tatton Park Biennial 2012, Flights of Fancy and was subsequently included in Risk at Turner Contemporary.

=== Limbo Drawings/ An Expanding Atlas of Subjectivity, ongoing ===
Whenever Faithfull makes a new drawing it is posted via the Limbo drawing service and automatically added to an ever-growing, online database which contains every drawing made by Faithfull since 2000.

An Expanding Atlas of Subjectivity is an artwork in the form of a bespoke hand-sewn bookwork, a paper archive that captures one particular moment from this database. Each time a new book is ordered the latest drawings are added so each book is thicker than the last and no two books will ever be the same. The bookwork makes physical the body of drawings that has accreted over more than a decade – manifesting a personal atlas of the world, mapping time and space, as experienced by one individual, on an ongoing basis.

Faithfull periodically exhibits An Expanding Atlas of Subjectivity as a gallery installation during which the most recent drawings are added as and when they are made. Exhibitions to date have taken place in Lille, National Museum, Project Space, Berlin, and at Phoenix Arts in Leicester.

=== Mobile Research Station no.1, 2009 ===
Mobile Research Station was a project commissioned by SKULPTURENPARK BERLIN_ZENTRUM in 2009, that took place in the centre of Berlin, between Seydelstr and Beuthstr. Half hi-tech Antarctic Research Station and half rusty broken-dumpster, this unit created by Faithfull provided a station for a group of artists/researchers to investigate the surrounding wilderness and urban zones in Berlin.

Other researchers included Esther Polak (Amsterdam), Aug Annika Lundgren (Gothenburg/Berlin), Martin John Callanan, Katie Paterson (London), Nick Crowe & Ian Rawlinson (Manchester/Berlin), Tim Knowles (London).

=== 0º00 Navigation Part I, 2008 and 0º00 Navigation Part II, 2015 ===
0º00 Navigation is a black and white film that shows an absurd journey made exactly along the Greenwich Meridian. Always seen from behind, a figure swims out of the seawater where the meridian hits the south-coast of Britain. The solitary person emerges from the water carrying a hand held GPS device. Using this implement the figure then proceeds to walk directly north along the 0º00 line of longitude. Any obstacle encountered is negotiated—fences climbed, properties crossed, buildings entered via nearest windows or apertures, streams waded, motorways traversed. The figure gradually makes its way up through southeast Britain, through London, the Midlands and ultimately where the line re-enters the water in the north of Britain the figure slowly swims away into the North Sea.

Half a decade later Faithfull again traversed the Meridian Line, this time travelling south through Europe and Africa heading towards the exact centre of nowhere. 0º00 Navigation Part II, A Journey Across Europe and Africa premiered at The Edge in Bath and was subsequently presented in a solo exhibition at Sprinhornhof Kunstverein, Germany. A third and final journey tracing the Meridian line across the planet is planned by Faithfull; "Eventually he will run out of land and take to sea again, with the ultimate aim of standing on a raft at 0°, 0° where the meridian meets the equator off the coast of West Africa. "I'm not really a daredevil type", he says, "and I don't actually intend to put myself in danger. I just want to go to these places, partly to see if they really exist".

=== Ice Blink, 2005 ===
Ice Blink was a lecture, exhibition and book commissioned by The Arts Catalyst that collected together the body of work made during a two-month journey to Antarctica in 2004/2005, traveling with the British Antarctic Survey on their research vessel, RRS Ernest Shackleton. This tied in with Faithfull's Antarctica Dispatches—the initial 'live' drawing project undertaken during the two-month journey. Prior to each of the exhibition openings, Faithfull delivered the Ice Blink lecture in a nearby theatre, drawing on the material he had collected during the course of the journey to illustrate a meandering journey through the myths of polar exploration.

=== Escape Vehicle No.6, 2004 ===
A domestic chair is attached to a weather balloon and launched into space. Commissioned by The Arts Catalyst as part of the Artists' Airshow 2004. Footage is relayed back to Earth as the live audience watches the chair travel 30 km away from the ground and into the edge of space. In 2009 to coincide with his solo exhibition, Gravity Sucks, at the BFI Southbank.

=== 30 km, 2003 ===
A journey into the stratosphere as seen by a video camera attached to a weather balloon. The film starts with the artist's face and then, after releasing the balloon, the shot pulls out, and out until the figure has disappeared into the English landscape. The film ends with a glimpse of the curve of the Earth and black space.

=== Orbital No.1, 2002 ===
Three London circular journeys were recorded in real time and combined into a single, hypnotic, projected circular image. The circular journeys were: the M25 Orbital Motorway, the North and South Circular, and the Circle Line.

=== Half-life & Half-life Attachments, 2001 ===
Each day a drawing on a palm-pilot was made somewhere in E1, London, and e-mailed back to the Whitechapel Gallery, London. The drawings were then forwarded on to an open list of subscribers as well as progressively inhabiting the gallery in a variety of forms.

=== Escape Vehicle No.2, 1996 ===
A miniature chair made from spent matches and powered by three dead blue bottles attached to the chair with fuse wire.

== Public art ==
=== Shy Dance-Floor (A Dance-Floor That Only Exists When No-One Is There), 2015 ===
In the shadows of a pedestrian under-pass, the approaching viewer sees a set of under-floor lights twinkling in the darkness. As they draw nearer, the viewer discovers a 1970s under-lit illuminated dance-floor pulsing silently to an unheard rhythm. Just as the viewer is about to enter the tunnel though, the lights vanish. Shy Dance Floor was presented as a 3-week intervention in a foot-tunnel in Hagen, Germany, as part of the Urban Lights Festival 2015

=== Liverpool to Liverpool, 2010 ===
In 2009, Simon Faithfull made a journey from Liverpool (UK) to Liverpool (Nova Scotia), traveling by container ship, train and bus. The artist recorded the everyday minutiae of the journey— recording the historic paths of trade and exodus. A total of 181 drawings were made and etched into the stone paving and glass of a new public site in Liverpool (UK).

=== Shy Fountain (A Fountain That Only Exists When No-One is There), 2008 ===
Shy Fountain has, to date, been realised twice – once temporally in the grounds of Haus am Waldsee, Berlin and once as a permanent public art work in Cannon's Marsh, Harbour-side, Bristol.

== Education ==
- 1994–1996 Master of Fine Art, Reading University, UK
- 1986–1989 BA First Class Honours, Central St Martins School of Art, London, UK

== Exhibitions ==
- 2010 Recent Findings: Simon Faithfull, Harris Museum, Preston, UK
- 2010 Voyages Extraordinaires: Simon Faithfull & Christoph Keller - CRAC Alsace, France
- 2009 Gravity Sucks, British Film Institute Gallery, London, UK
- 2009 Simon Faithfull & Carla Guagliardi - Schwerlos. Haus am Waldsee, Berlin, Germany
- 2008 Simon Faithfull - Selected Video Works, Gallerie Polaris, Paris, France
- 2006 Ice Blink, Parker's Box, New York, USA
- 2006 Ice Blink, Stills, Edinburgh, Scotland, UK
- 2006 Ice Blink, Cell Project Space, London, UK
- 2005 Antarctica Dispatches, CCA, Glasgow, UK (+screens at: ICA, Southampton City Gallery)
- 2004 Hard Drive, ICA (digital studio), London, UK
- 2004 Vanishing Point - Pump House, Battersea, London, UK
- 2004 30 km, Film and Video Umbrella Commission - Aspex Gallery, Portsmouth, UK
- 2003 Dreamland, Turner Contemporary, Margate, UK
- 2003 Terrestrial Investigation #256, SPACE, London, UK
- 2002 Simon Faithfull & Bruno Peinado, Parker's Box, New York, USA
- 2002 Dogends, Transit Space, London, UK
- 2002 Psychotopography, ArtSway, Hampshire, UK
