= Eva von Sacher-Masoch =

Austrian aristocrat (1912-1991)

Eva von Sacher-Masoch, Baroness Erisso
- Born: Eva Hermine von Sacher-Masoch; 4 December 1912; Budapest, Austria-Hungary
- Died: 22 May 1991 (aged 78); Reading, England
- Spouse: Robert Glynn Faithfull (m. 1946; sep. 1952)
- Children: Marianne Faithfull

Eva von Sacher-Masoch, Baroness Erisso (4 December 1912 – 22 May 1991) was an Austrian dancer and aristocrat who was the mother of English singer and actress Marianne Faithfull.

== Life and career ==
Sacher-Masoch was born Eva Hermine von Sacher-Masoch, Freiin Erisso to Artur Wolfgang, Ritter von Sacher-Masoch (1875–1953) and his wife, Flora (Ziprisz) in Budapest. Through her father, she was the grand-niece of the utopian humanist author Leopold von Sacher-Masoch, author of Venus in Furs. She was the sister of renowned novelist Alexander von Sacher-Masoch (1901–1972). Her mother was Jewish.

Sacher-Masoch spent her early childhood living on her family's estates near the town of Karánsebes in Transylvania (now Caransebeș, Romania), moving with her family to Vienna in 1918. As a young woman she moved to Berlin where she worked as a ballerina for the Max Reinhardt Company, and danced for productions of Bertolt Brecht and Kurt Weill. At the outbreak of World War II, Sacher-Masoch returned to her parents' home in Vienna and lived there for the duration of the war. Despite their Jewish ancestry, Sacher-Masoch and her mother were afforded a degree of protection from the Nazis due to Artur's World War I military record and his status as a well-regarded Austrian writer (under the pseudonym Michael Zorn).

Having opposed Hitler since the Anschluss, and witnessing atrocities against Jews in the streets of Vienna, Sacher-Masoch and her parents used their home to conceal Socialist pamphlets, narrowly evading detection by the Gestapo. Sacher-Masoch witnessed the United States Army Air Forces daylight raids on Vienna from 1944 onwards, and the Red Army's assault on Vienna in 1945. Confronting the trauma civilians had been subject to, the BBC genealogical documentary series Who Do You Think You Are? details her journalistic accomplishments in reestablishing a German language woman's magazine after the war.

When the British arrived to occupy part of the liberated city, Sacher-Masoch fell in love with Major Robert Glynn Faithfull, a British Army officer and spy who called on the family to inform them that Alexander von Sacher-Masoch was alive. The couple married in 1946 and late that year had their only child, daughter Marianne Faithfull (born Marian Evelyn Faithfull), and lived together at Braziers Park, Oxfordshire, before separating six years later. She also spent some time as a dance teacher at "Bylands", Stratfield Turgis, near Basingstoke, Hampshire, a boarding school for maladjusted children. She moved to Reading, Berkshire to work as a waitress at a Sally's Café, Friar Street.
