= Sister Morphine =

Single by Marianne Faithfull

- US single label without Faithful's songwriting credit

Single by Marianne Faithfull
- Released: 21 February 1969
- Recorded: July 1968
- Genre: Blues rock; folk rock
- Length: 5:33
- Label: Decca (UK); London (US)
- Songwriters: Marianne Faithfull; Mick Jagger; Keith Richards
- Producer: Mick Jagger

"Sister Morphine" is a song written by Marianne Faithfull, Mick Jagger and Keith Richards. Faithfull released the original version of the song as the B-side to her Decca Records single "Something Better" on 21 February 1969. A different version was released two years later by the Rolling Stones for their 1971 album Sticky Fingers.

== Recording and composition ==
The personnel for the Faithfull version are Marianne on vocals, Jagger on acoustic guitar, Ry Cooder on slide guitar and bass guitar, Jack Nitzsche on piano and organ, and Charlie Watts on drums. It was recorded during the Beggars Banquet sessions.

The original UK Decca single credited Faithfull as a co-writer, but when London Records issued the single in the United States, her name was omitted, as it was from the credit on Sticky Fingers. After a legal battle Faithfull retained her rights as a co-author, acknowledged by the 1994 Virgin Records reissue of the Stones' album catalogue from Sticky Fingers through Steel Wheels.

The meaning of the lyrics is not clear. Initially widely interpreted as a tale of waking up after overdosing, Jagger later stated that “It’s about a man after an accident, really”, although the nature of the accident is not mentioned in the song, such as whether it was accidentally overdosing or some other accident and the person is merely craving drugs for the pain. In 2018, Faithfull told writer Kris Needs that the song was “my self-portrait in a dark mirror, my miniature gothic masterpiece, my celebration of death.”

== Releases ==
In the United Kingdom, Faithfull's single was withdrawn by Decca due to the drug reference in the title, after an estimated 500 copies had been issued, but in other countries the single remained in release. In some territories such as the Netherlands, Italy and Japan, “Sister Morphine” appeared on the A-side. In addition, the French, US and Netherlands editions of the single actually featured alternate versions of both sides to the UK release. Faithfull performed "Something Better" sung live to a backing track at The Rolling Stones Rock and Roll Circus, but the programme was never televised and no contemporary performance of "Sister Morphine" is known.

Faithfull recorded the song again in 1979, during the sessions for her Broken English album, and it was subsequently released on a 7-inch and 12-inch single with "Broken English". This recording appears as a bonus track on the second disc of the 2013 deluxe edition of the album. The song remained a staple of her concert set-list and appeared on the live albums Blazing Away in 1990 and No Exit in 2016.

== Charts ==
Chart (2014–2015)	Peak position
UK Physical Singles (OCC)	34
UK Vinyl Singles (OCC)	21

== Rolling Stones version ==
"Sister Morphine"

Song by The Rolling Stones

from the album Sticky Fingers
- Released: April 23, 1971
- Recorded: March 1969
- Length: 5:31
- Label: Rolling Stones
- Songwriters: Jagger-Richards; Marianne Faithfull
- Producer: Jimmy Miller

The Stones' version, with slightly different lyrics, featured Jagger on vocals, Richards on acoustic guitar, Cooder and Nitzsche again on slide guitar and piano respectively, Bill Wyman on bass, and Watts again on drums.

Classic Rock History critic Matthew Pollard rated "Sister Morphine" as the Rolling Stones' 3rd best deep cut, saying that it's "the Stones’ murkiest song, but it’s one of their greatest."

Rarely played by the Rolling Stones in concert, it was performed live during the band's 1997–1998 Bridges to Babylon Tour, and featured on the subsequent live album, No Security.
