= Dreamin' My Dreams (Marianne Faithfull album) =

Studio album by Marianne Faithfull
- Released: 1976
- Recorded: 1975–76
- Studio: IBC Studios, London
- Genre: Country; pop
- Label: NEMS
- Producer: Mike Leander; Derek Wadsworth; John Worth; Bob Potter; Bill Landis

Marianne Faithfull chronology
Loveinamist (1967)	Dreamin' My Dreams (1976)	Broken English (1979)

Faithless

Singles from Dreamin' My Dreams
- 1. "Dreamin' My Dreams" Released: 7 November 1975; 2. "Wrong Road Again" Released: 1976; 3. "All I Wanna Do In Life" Released: 10 September 1976

Singles from Faithless
- 1. "The Way You Want Me To Be" Released: 1978; 2. "Dreamin' My Dreams (France)" Released: 1978; 3. "Wrong Road Again (Australia)" Released: May 1978

Professional ratings
Review scores
Source	Rating
AllMusic	3/5 stars
Uncut	3/5 stars

Dreamin' My Dreams is the fifth studio album by English singer Marianne Faithfull. It was released in 1976 by NEMS Records and it is Faithfull's first and only record of country music. The album was re-released two years later in 1978 as Faithless. The main differences between the two albums are: the album art and Faithless including four more tracks and some tracks rearranged. The musicians on both versions of the album are The Grease Band. It was Faithfull's first released album in almost a decade.

The single "Dreamin' My Dreams" topped the charts in Ireland in 1976. Waylon Jennings and Crystal Gayle had recorded versions of the song in 1975. It was later recorded by Patty Loveless, Alison Krauss, Cowboy Junkies, Mark Chesnutt, Emmylou Harris with Rodney Crowell amongst others.

The album was also notable for the noticeable change in Faithfull's singing voice. As a result of years of smoking, drinking, and drug use, her once melodic vocals from her early career were replaced by a deep, huskier voice that later came to good use on later records including her comeback album Broken English released three years later.

== Track listing ==
=== Dreamin' My Dreams ===
1. "Dreamin' My Dreams" (Allen Reynolds)
2. "Fairy Tale Hero" (John Rostill)
3. "This Time" (Waylon Jennings)
4. "I'm Not Lisa" (Jessi Colter)
5. "The Way You Want Me to Be" (David Price, Thomas Kelly)
6. "Wrong Road Again" (Allen Reynolds)
7. "All I Wanna Do in Life" (Allen Reynolds, Sandy Mason Theoret)
8. "I'm Looking for Blue Eyes" (Miriam Eddy)
9. "Somebody Loves You" (Allen Reynolds)
10. "Vanilla O'Lay" (Jackie DeShannon)
11. "Lady Madelaine" (Marianne Faithfull, Bill Landis, Bill Shepherd)
12. "Sweet Little Sixteen" (Chuck Berry)

=== Faithless (Dreamin' My Dreams re-release) ===
1. "Dreamin' My Dreams" (Allen Reynolds) - 3:20
2. "Vanilla O'Lay" (Jackie DeShannon) - 3:58
3. "Wait for Me Down by the River" (Bob Johnson) - 3:36
4. "I'll Be Your Baby Tonight" (Bob Dylan) - 3:55
5. "Lady Madelaine" (Marianne Faithfull, Bill Landis, Bill Shepherd) - 4:24
6. "Somebody Loves You" (CD bonus track)
7. "All I Wanna Do in Life" (Allen Reynolds, Sandy Mason Theoret) - 2:44
8. "The Way You Want Me to Be" (David Price, Thomas Kelly) - 2:08
9. "Wrong Road Again" (Allen Reynolds) - 2:50
10. "That Was the Day (Nashville)" (Marianne Faithfull) (Recorded exclusively for this edition) - 4:17
11. "This Time" (Waylon Jennings) - 3:04
12. "I'm Not Lisa" (Jessi Colter) - 3:20
13. "Fairy Tale Hero" (John Rostill)
14. "Honky Tonk Angels" (J.D. Miller) (Recorded exclusively for this edition) - 4:06
15. "I'm Looking for Blue Eyes" (Miriam Eddy) (CD bonus track)
16. "Sweet Little Sixteen" (Chuck Berry) (CD bonus track)

Note

- The Vinyl edition omits "Somebody Loves You", "I'm Looking For Blue Eyes" and "Sweet Little Sixteen".
- Faithless was re-released in 1985 as the second record in Rich Kid Blues.
- Faithless was also re-released in 2007 under the title No Regrets.

== Personnel ==
Production

- Bill Landis – "Dreamin' My Dreams" and "Lady Madelaine"
- Bob Potter – "Wait for Me Down by the River", I'll Be Your Baby Tonight", That Was The Day (Nashville)" and "Honky Tonk Angels"
- Derek Wadsworth – "Vanilla O'Lay", "The Way You Want Me to Be", "Wrong Road Again" and "This Time"
- John Worth – "Somebody Loves You", "All I Wanna Do in Life", "I'm Not Lisa" and "Fairy Tale Hero"
