= Terry Stannard =

English drummer (1949–2019)

Terence Philip Stannard (28 June 1949 – 25 October 2019) was an English drummer. Born in Plaistow, West Ham, he moved to Wiltshire with his family at age 12. When he was 17, he returned to London to play drums for The Freddie Mack Road Show.

His first recordings were made for Long John Baldry in 1972 on the Everything Stops for Tea album. In that year he also recorded with Tony Kelly – Bring Me Back, and Roger Morris – First Album. He often worked with the producer John Porter. Throughout the 1970s he recorded with Dave Elliott, Casablanca, Chris Jagger, Bryn Haworth, Kokomo, Sandra Bernhard, Alexis Corner with Keith Richards, Duster Bennett, The Grease Band, Gerry Lockran, Andy Brown, Bob Young and Marianne Faithfull.

Kokomo were prime exponents of British soul in the 1970s. Stannard was a founding member of the band along with Tony O'Malley. Stannard played drums only on the band's self-titled first album. In January 1975 the Naughty Rhythms Tour included Dr. Feelgood, Kokomo and Chilli Willi who were three top-flight London pub rock bands wishing to play bigger venues.

In the late 1970s and early 1980s he played drums for Marianne Faithfull on her albums which included Broken English and Dangerous Acquaintances. He also co-wrote the title song from the album Broken English.

During his playing career he toured and gigged with many artists including Linda Lewis, Boz Burrell, Juicy Lucy, Herbie Goins & The Night-Timers, Carol Grimes (in a band called Uncle Dog that released an album and single in 1972), Henry McCullough, Steve Winwood, Zoot Money, Frankie Miller, The Mirrors and Andy Bown. He also toured with Eric Burden three times as well as Alexis Corner.

For six years in the 1990s he taught drums in Wiltshire. He lived in Dorset until his death in 2019.
