= Barry Reynolds =

British guitar player, songwriter, composer and producer

Barry Reynolds (born 27 October 1949, in Bolton, Lancashire) is a British guitar player, songwriter, composer and producer, best known for his long-lasting collaboration with Marianne Faithfull.

Reynolds first emerged with the band Pacific Drift which recorded one album that was released in 1970. Reynolds served as guitar player, one of the songwriters and lead vocalist for this short lived quartet from Manchester, England. Feelin' Free the band's only album was released on Deram Nova in 1970. The album was reissued by Grapefruit Records on CD in 2010. Reynolds left the band in 1970.

After joining blues band Blodwyn Pig alongside Mick Abrahams of Jethro Tull, Reynolds moved to the US in 1972 then traveled to Mexico before returning to the UK. In 1974, Reynolds released a single, "Outsiders Point of View", on RAK Records produced by Alan David. In 1976, Reynolds joined Marianne Faithfull's band, beginning a writing partnership that initially produced songs "Broken English" and "Why Do You Do It?", which attracted the attention of Island Records' founder Chris Blackwell who then signed Faithfull in 1978 and released the album Broken English the following year.

Reynolds continued to work as a songwriting collaborator with Faithfull and as guitarist in her band for two more albums Dangerous Acquaintances released in 1981 and A Child's Adventure released in 1983. After a 16-year break Reynolds and Faithfull resumed collaborating on Vagabond Ways in 1999.

In 1980, Reynolds joined Sly and Robbie, Wally Badarou, Mikey Chung and Uziah "Sticky" Thompson, aka the Compass Point Allstars, a studio band Blackwell created and named after his Compass Point Studios in Nassau, Bahamas to produce albums by Grace Jones, Joe Cocker and Black Uhuru among others. He then released his first solo album I Scare Myself recorded with the Allstars, namely Sly and Robbie, Wally Badarou, Mikey Chung and Uziah "Sticky" Thompson with Judy Mowatt and Marcia Griffiths singing backing vocals on two tracks. Also included are his versions of the following tracks, originally recorded with Faithfull: "Guilt", "Broken English" and "Times Square".

After moving back to New York, Reynolds has since devoted most of his time to writing, notably with Baaba Maal (Nomad Soul and Television albums), Grace Jones ("Well Well Well" on her 2008 Hurricane album), two Brazilian Girls' records on Verve Records, all the while continuing working with Faithfull. His last collaborations include the 2013 compilation Son of Rogues Gallery: Pirate Ballads, Sea Songs & Chanteys with Beth Orton, Johnny Depp, Lou Reed and Pete Doherty.

== Discography ==
- 1982 I Scare Myself (Island Records) produced by Alex Sadkin
