= Broken English (album) =

1979 album by Marianne Faithfull

Studio album by Marianne Faithfull
- Released: 2 November 1979
- Recorded: May–July 1979
- Studios: Matrix Studios, London
- Genre: New wave
- Length: 36:25
- Label: Island
- Producer: Mark Miller Mundy

Marianne Faithfull chronology
Dreamin' My Dreams (1976)	Broken English (1979)	Dangerous Acquaintances (1981)

Singles from Broken English
- 1. "The Ballad of Lucy Jordan" Released: 26 October 1979; 2. "Broken English" Released: 25 January 1980; 3. "Working Class Hero" Released: 14 June 1980; 4. "Broken English / Sister Morphine" Released: 11 June 1982

Broken English is the seventh studio album by English singer Marianne Faithfull. It was released on 2 November 1979 by Island Records. The album marked a major comeback for Faithfull after years of drug abuse, homelessness and anorexia. It is often regarded as her definitive recording, and Faithfull herself described it as her "masterpiece".

Broken English was Faithfull's first major release since her album Love in a Mist (1967). After ending her relationship with Mick Jagger in 1970 and losing custody of her son, Faithfull suffered from heroin addiction and lived on the streets of London. Severe laryngitis and drug abuse during this period permanently altered Faithfull's voice, leaving it cracked and lower in pitch. She attempted a comeback in 1976 with Dreamin' My Dreams, which achieved only minor success. Shortly afterwards, Faithfull began working with musician Barry Reynolds, who produced the songs "Broken English" and "Why D'Ya Do It". The demos attracted the attention of Chris Blackwell who signed Faithfull to his record label Island Records.

The album was recorded at Matrix Studios in London. Faithfull collaborated with producer Mark Miller Mundy on the remaining songs for the album. After the whole album was recorded, he suggested making the music "more modern and electronic" and brought in Steve Winwood on keyboards. Musically, Broken English is a new wave album with elements of other genres such as punk, blues and reggae.

Broken English received critical acclaim. It peaked at number 82 on the Billboard 200, becoming her first album to chart in the United States since Go Away from My World (1965) and giving Faithfull a first nomination for the Grammy Award for Best Female Rock Vocal Performance. It reached number 57 in the United Kingdom and entered the top five in Germany, France and New Zealand. Broken English was certified platinum in Germany and France, and sold over one million copies worldwide. Two singles were released from the album, with "The Ballad of Lucy Jordan" peaking at number 48 on the UK Singles Chart. The album was included on NME magazine's list of "500 Greatest Albums of All Time" and in the book 1001 Albums You Must Hear Before You Die.

== Background ==
Faithfull's immediately preceding albums, Dreamin' My Dreams and Faithless, had been in a relatively gentle folk or country and western style. Broken English was a radical departure, featuring a contemporary fusion of punk, new wave and dance, with liberal use of synthesizers. After years of cigarette smoking and drug use, Faithfull's voice was in a lower register, far raspier, and had a more world-weary quality than in the past that matched the often raw emotions expressed in the newer songs.

The backing band of Barry Reynolds and Joe Mavety (guitars), Steve York (bass) and Terry Stannard (drums) had been formed in 1977 to tour Ireland with Faithfull promoting Dreamin' My Dreams.

Marianne Faithfull recounted how Mark Mundy was brought on as the album's producer: "I don't think I could have handled Broken English without a producer. You can't imagine what it was like. There I am with no respect at all within the music business. ... So I found somebody who wanted the break, and that was Mark Mundy. He wanted to be a record producer, and he had some great ideas."

== Composition ==
The album's title track took inspiration from terrorist figures of the time, particularly Ulrike Meinhof of the Baader-Meinhof group. "Guilt" was informed by the Catholic upbringing of the singer and her composer Barry Reynolds. "The Ballad of Lucy Jordan", originally performed by Dr. Hook & the Medicine Show, is a melancholy tale of a middle-class housewife's disillusionment; Faithfull's version became something of an anthem and was used on the soundtracks of the films Montenegro (1981) and Thelma & Louise (1991). "What's the Hurry?" was described by Faithfull as reflecting the everyday desperation of the habitual drug user. Her cover of John Lennon's "Working Class Hero" was recorded as a tribute to her own heroes such as Mick Jagger and Keith Richards, David Bowie and Iggy Pop, and Lennon himself.

The last track, the six-and-a-half-minute "Why'd Ya Do It?", is a caustic, graphic rant of a woman reacting to her lover's infidelity. The lyrics began with the man's point of view, relating the bitter tirade of his cheated-on lover. It was set to a grinding tune inspired by Jimi Hendrix's recording of "Pali Gap". Poet and writer Heathcote Williams had originally conceived the lyrics as a piece for Tina Turner to record, but Faithfull succeeded in convincing him that Turner would never record such a number. The song's profanity and explicit reference to oral sex (which earned the album a "Parental Advisory" label on some versions) caused controversy. In Australia, Festival Records refused to release the album with "Why D'Ya Do It" intact. Festival had recently been through an expensive legal battle over Skyhooks albums that had been confiscated by the local vice squad on the basis of obscenity, and this is said to have motivated their refusal to release the song. Faithfull refused to have the album altered, but initial Australian pressings omitted "Why D'Ya Do It" anyway and instead included a 'bonus' 7" single of the extended version of "Broken English". The ban did not extend to import copies, and the song was also played unedited on the Government-funded Double Jay radio station and Brisbane community broadcaster 4ZZZ. It wasn't until the 1987 reissue that "Why D'Ya Do It" was finally included.

== Release and promotion ==
The deluxe reissue was conceived and compiled by Andrew Batt. It was released in January 2013 in a cardboard sleeve and features the original album remastered by Jared Hawkes, with the first disc consisting only of the original album along with a 12-minute music video directed by Derek Jarman. The film was designed to be shown in theatres and had never been released for home video before.

The second disc features the original mix of the album, which in some cases sounds significantly different and, in the case of "Why'd Ya Do It", runs nearly two minutes longer than the album version. Supplemented by single edits, 7, 12-inch remixes and Faithfull's re-recorded version of "Sister Morphine", which had previously appeared on a 12-inch release, the second disc with the original mix was Faithfull's preferred mix of the album. The original mix received its release for the first time as part of this reissue.

The spoken-word track "The Letter" (not to be confused with the song recorded by The Box Tops, and Joe Cocker) which has Faithfull recite the 'It Was Not My Fault' letter from the French novel Les Liaisons dangereuses, was not included. Although the track did appear in some countries on the B-side of the 1982 Island anniversary 12-inch remix/re-issue of Broken English, it was left off the deluxe edition because it was recorded as the introduction of an extended video for "Intrigue" from her next album Dangerous Acquaintances, the title of which was the literal translation of Les Liaisons dangereuses.

The 24-page booklet includes numerous photos from the cover session by Dennis Morris, and examples of the various sleeves and album cover variations that appeared in different countries.

Faithfull notoriously performed the title track and "Guilt" on Saturday Night Live in February 1980 where her voice cracked and she seemingly strained to even vocalise at times. This performance, which some have called one of the worst on the live show, has been attributed to everything from her continuing drug use to her nervousness due to her former lover Mick Jagger making contact with her right before the performance.

== Critical reception ==
Professional ratings
Review scores
Source	Rating
AllMusic	4.5/5 stars
The Guardian	5/5 stars
The Irish Times	4/5 stars
Pitchfork	8.7/10
Q	4/5 stars
Record Collector	4/5 stars
Rolling Stone	4/5 stars
The Rolling Stone Album Guide	4/5 stars
Spin Alternative Record Guide	9/10
The Village Voice	A−

Writing for Rolling Stone, Greil Marcus gave the album a four star review, calling it a "kind of triumph" and a "stunning account of the life that goes on after the end, an awful, liberating, harridan's laugh at the life that came before." Marcus notes that "Faithfull sings as if she means to get every needle, every junkie panic, every empty pill bottle and every filthy room into her voice – as if she spent the last ten years of oblivion trying to kill the face that first brought her to our attention. The voice is a croak, a scratch, all breaks and yelps and constrictions. Though her voice seems perverse, it soon becomes clear that it is also the voice of a woman who is comfortable with what she sounds like....It is a perfectly intentional, controlled, unique statement about fury, defeat and rancor: the other side of Christine McVie's lovely out-of-reach romances. It isn't anything we've heard before, from anyone."

In their review of the album, Billboard called it "an album that is sure to raise eyebrows. "Why D'Ya Do It" is the most controversial track with its off colour language that CBS and EMI have refused to distribute in England. The rest of the album features Faithlull's new wavish raspy vocals applied to John Lennon's "Working Class Hero," Shel Silverstein's "Ballad of Lucy Jordan" along with six originals."

Cashbox noted that "with a tight, near Velvet Underground band behind her, Marianne delivers crystal clear visions of reality that culminate themselves in the track "Why D'Ya Do It," which is probably the most sincere attempt at a "woman's song" this planet has ever heard."

AllMusic awarded it four-and-a-half stars, retrospectively commenting that "after a lengthy absence, Faithfull resurfaced on this 1979 album, which took the edgy and brittle sound of punk rock and gave it a shot of studio-smooth dance rock. Faithfull's whiskey-worn vocals perfectly match the bitter and biting 'Why'd Ya Do It' [sic] and revitalize John Lennon's 'Working Class Hero.'"

Reviewing the deluxe edition of the record in 2013, Pitchfork observed that "it's still raw enough to make you squirm – the cracked, undead voice of a woman back from exile to make a record about the simple audacity of staying alive...The resulting album feels so intimate and personal that it's easy to overstate its singularity. But Broken English is more than just a portrait of the addict as a middle-aged woman; it captures an entire generation's disillusioned comedown."

Alexis Petridis from The Guardian gave the deluxe edition a five star review, noting that "more impressive still, it retains its capacity to shock: not because of the language...but because there's something utterly believable about Faithfull's tone of contempt...Broken English careers by, its 35 minutes as bracingly full of venom and spite as anything her punk admirers could muster. For Faithfull, it seemed to work as catharsis."

DownBeat assigned the album 4 stars. Reviewer Frank-John Hadley wrote, "Who would have guessed that Marianne Faithfull would resurface with a record which begs to stand as a non-feminist monument to womankind—eight fascinating songs which vividly assert her point of view, while having across-the-board appeal via kinetic Anglo-rock dance grooves . . . Faithfull, who is self-revealing but not grandiloquent, becomes persona grata with Broken English. The fusing of her sensibilities to excellent backing and fine material marks this record as an unexpectedly alluring triumph".

== Singles ==
Broken English reached No. 57 on the UK Album Chart, and No. 82 in the US. "The Ballad of Lucy Jordan" was released as a single simultaneously with the LP in October 1979. The title track was issued as a single in January 1980. Faithfull included five tracks from the album on her 1990 live recording Blazing Away: "Broken English", "Guilt", "The Ballad of Lucy Jordan", "Working Class Hero" and "Why D'Ya Do It". In 1996, "Witches' Song" was covered by Juliana Hatfield for the soundtrack of the film The Craft.

An extended remix of the title track (5:46) was released on 12" vinyl in 1979 and included as a bonus 7" with the Australian pressing. An unofficial remix produced by Baron von Luxxury led to the song being re-added to numerous DJ playlists, including BBC Radio 1, in early 2008.

== Track listing ==
No.	Title	Writer(s)	Length
1.	"Broken English"	Marianne Faithfull; Barry Reynolds; Joe Mavety; Steve York; Terry Stannard	4:35
2.	"Witches' Song"	Faithfull; Reynolds; Mavety; York; Stannard	4:43
3.	"Brain Drain"	Ben Brierley	4:13
4.	"Guilt"	Reynolds	5:05
5.	"The Ballad of Lucy Jordan"	Shel Silverstein	4:09
6.	"What's the Hurry"	Mavety	3:05
7.	"Working Class Hero"	John Lennon	4:40
8.	"Why D'Ya Do It"	Heathcote Williams; Reynolds; Mavety; York; Stannard; Faithfull	6:45

2013 Deluxe Edition (Disc 2)
No.	Title	Writer(s)	Length
1.	"Broken English" (Original Mix)	Faithfull; Reynolds; Mavety; York; Stannard	4:42
2.	"Witches' Song" (Original Mix)	Faithfull; Reynolds; Mavety; York; Stannard	5:00
3.	"Brain Drain" (Original Mix)	Brierley	4:10
4.	"Guilt" (Original Mix)	Reynolds	5:05
5.	"The Ballad of Lucy Jordan" (Original Mix)	Silverstein	4:16
6.	"What's the Hurry" (Original Mix)	Mavety	3:17
7.	"Working Class Hero" (Original Mix)	Lennon	4:41
8.	"Why D'Ya Do It" (Original Mix)	Williams; Reynolds; Mavety; York; Stannard; Faithfull	8:42
9.	"Sister Morphine" (12" Version)	Mick Jagger; Keith Richards; Faithfull	6:04
10.	"Broken English" (7" Single Version)	Faithfull; Reynolds; Mavety; York; Stannard	3:08
11.	"Broken English" (7" Remix Version)	Faithfull; Reynolds; Mavety; York; Stannard	3:00
12.	"Broken English" (Long Version)	Faithfull; Reynolds; Mavety; York; Stannard	5:47
13.	"Why D'Ya Do It" (12" Remix Version)	Williams; Reynolds; Mavety; York; Stannard; Faithfull	6:35

Notes

- "Why D'Ya Do It" was omitted for a 7" vinyl of the extended version of "Broken English" on the original Australian pressings of the album.

== Personnel ==
- Marianne Faithfull – vocals
- Barry Reynolds, Joe Mavety, Guy Humphries– guitars
- Steve Winwood – keyboards
- Steve York – bass
- Darryl Way – violin
- Jim Cuomo – saxophone
- Terry Stannard – drums
- Morris Pert – percussion
- Dyan Birch, Frankie Collins, Isabella Dulaney– background vocals

Technical

- Bob Potter – engineer, mixing
- Ed Thacker – mixing engineer
- Dennis Morris – sleeve photography
- Mark Miller Mundy – arrangement and production

== Charts ==
=== Weekly charts ===
Chart	Peak position
Australian Kent Music Report Albums Chart	27
Austrian Albums Chart	3
Canadian RPM Albums Chart	28
Dutch Mega Albums Chart	37
French SNEP Albums Chart	3
New Zealand Albums Chart	2
Swedish Albums Chart	4
UK Albums Chart	57
US Billboard 200	82
Scottish Albums (Official Charts)	90
German Albums (Offizielle Top 100)	4

=== Year-end charts ===
Chart (1980)	Position
Austrian Albums Chart	11
French Albums Chart	6
German Albums (Offizielle Top 100)	17
New Zealand Albums (RMNZ)	22

== Certifications and sales ==
Region	Certification	Certified units/sales
Australia (ARIA)	Platinum	50,000^{^}
Canada (Music Canada)	Platinum	100,000^{^}
Germany (BVMI)	Gold	250,000^{^}
France (SNEP)	Gold	100,000^{*}
New Zealand (RMNZ)	Platinum	15,000^{^}
United Kingdom (BPI)	Silver	60,000^{‡}
^{*} Sales figures based on certification alone.^{^} Shipments figures based on certification alone.
