= Love in a Mist (album) =

Studio album by Marianne Faithfull
- Released: 2 March 1967
- Genre: Folk rock; baroque pop; pop rock
- Length: 38:59
- Label: Decca
- Producer: Mike Leander

Marianne Faithfull chronology
Faithfull Forever (1966)	Love in a Mist (1967)	Dreamin' My Dreams (1976)

Love in a Mist (alternately titled Loveinamist) is the fourth studio album by British singer Marianne Faithfull, released in 1967. Michael Cooper is credited for the design and photography.

Many of the tracks had been released in the US several months earlier on the US-only Faithfull Forever. This would be her last studio album release until 1976's Dreamin' My Dreams.

== Track listing ==
1. "Yesterday" (John Lennon, Paul McCartney) – 2:15
2. "You Can't Go Where the Roses Go" (Jackie DeShannon) – 2:55
3. "Our Love Has Gone" (Chris Andrews) – 3:15
4. "Don't Make Promises You Can't Keep" (Tim Hardin) – 2:48
5. "In the Night Time" (Donovan) – 3:00
6. "This Little Bird" (John D. Loudermilk) – 2:00
7. "Ne Me Quitte Pas" (Jacques Demy, Michel Legrand) – 2:32
8. "Counting" (Bob Lind) (UK version only) – 2:50
9. "Reason to Believe" (Tim Hardin) – 2:17
10. "Coquillages" (Marcel Stellman, Michael John Taylor) – 3:37
11. "With You in Mind" (Jackie DeShannon) – 2:25
12. "Young Girl Blues" (Donovan) – 3:35
13. "Good Guy" (Donovan) – 2:45
14. "I Have a Love" (Stephen Sondheim, Leonard Bernstein) – 2:45

Bonus tracks on 1988 CD re-issue:

1. "Hang On to a Dream" (Tim Hardin)
2. "Rosie, Rosie" (Ray Davies)
3. "Monday, Monday" (John Phillips)
