= Marianne Faithfull =

English singer and actress (1946–2025)

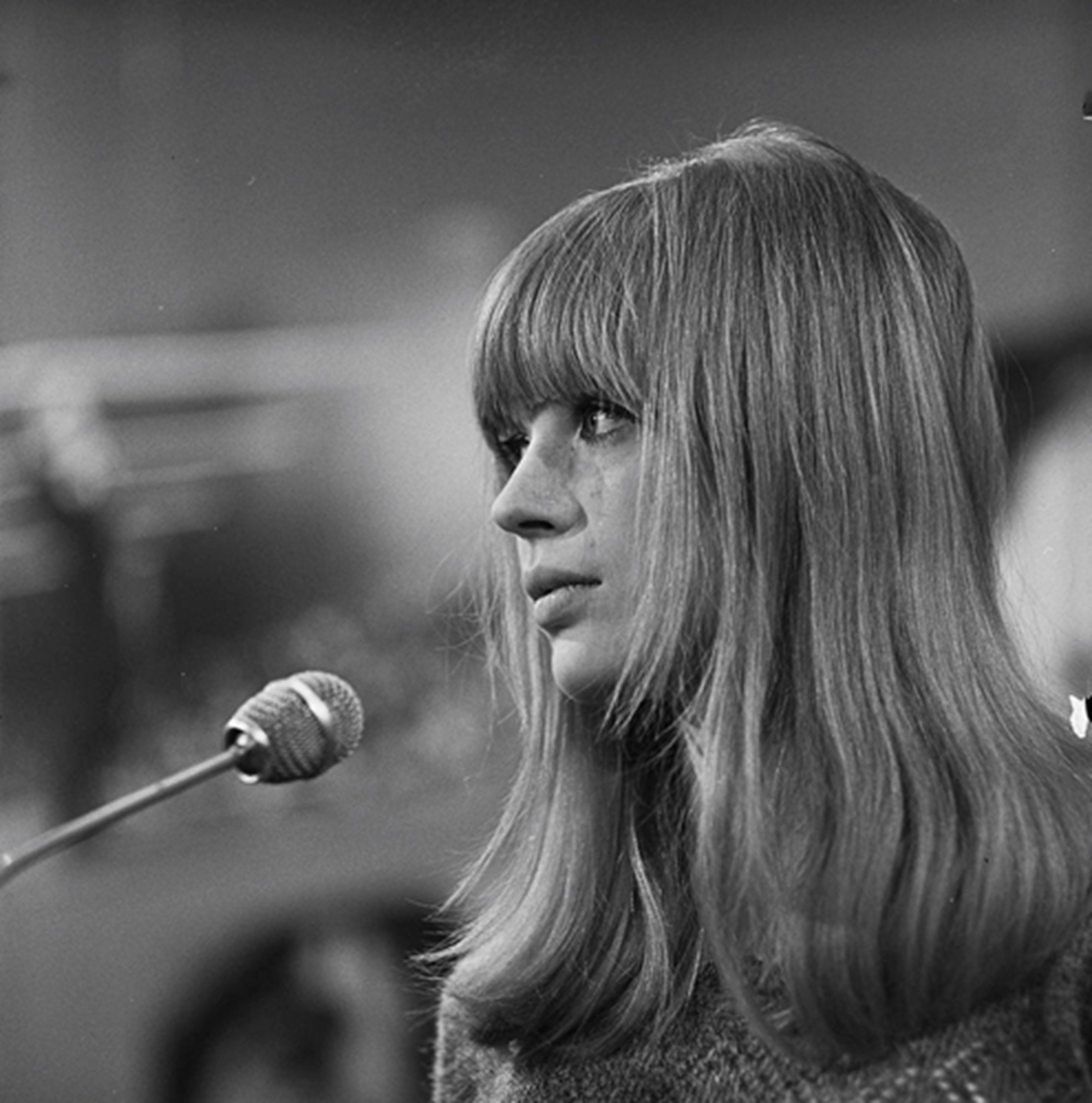
- Faithfull in 1966
- Born: Marianne Evelyn Gabriel Faithfull; 29 December 1946; Hampstead, London, England
- Died: 30 January 2025 (aged 78); London, England
- Occupations: Singer; actress
- Years active: 1964–2025
- Spouses: John Dunbar (m. 1965; div. 1966) Ben Brierly (m. 1979; div. 1986) Giorgio Della Terza (m. 1988; div. 1991)
- Partner: Mick Jagger (1966–1970)
- Children: 1
- Mother: Eva von Sacher-Masoch
- Relatives: Simon Faithfull (half-brother)
- Musical career
- Genres: Rock; folk; alternative; blues; jazz
- Labels: Decca; London; Island; RCA; Hut/Virgin; Naïve
- Website: mariannefaithfull.org.uk

Marianne Evelyn Gabriel Faithfull (29 December 1946 – 30 January 2025) was an English singer and actress who achieved popularity in the 1960s with the release of her UK top 10 single "As Tears Go By". She became one of the leading female artists of the British Invasion in the United States.

Born in Hampstead, London, Faithfull began her career in 1964 after attending a party for the Rolling Stones, where she was discovered by the band's manager Andrew Loog Oldham. Her 1965 debut album Marianne Faithfull, released simultaneously with her more folk-based sophomore album Come My Way, was a huge success and was followed by further albums on Decca Records. From 1966 to 1970 she had a highly publicised romantic relationship with Mick Jagger. Her popularity was enhanced by roles in films, including I'll Never Forget What's'isname (1967), The Girl on a Motorcycle (1968) and Hamlet (1969). Her popularity was overshadowed by personal problems in the 1970s, when she became anorexic, homeless and addicted to heroin.

During her 1960s musical career, Faithfull was noted for her distinctive melodic, high-register vocals. In the subsequent decade her voice was altered by severe laryngitis, smoking and persistent drug abuse, which left her sounding permanently raspy, cracked and lower in pitch. The new sound was praised as "whisky soaked" by some critics and was seen as having helped to capture the raw emotions expressed in her music.

After a long absence, Faithfull made a musical comeback in 1979 with the release of a critically acclaimed seventh studio album, Broken English. The album was a commercial success and marked a resurgence of her musical career. Broken English earned Faithfull a nomination for a Grammy Award for Best Female Rock Vocal Performance and is regarded as her "definitive recording". She followed this with further albums including Dangerous Acquaintances (1981), A Child's Adventure (1983) and Strange Weather (1987). Faithfull wrote three books about her life: Faithfull: An Autobiography (1994), Memories, Dreams & Reflections (2007) and Marianne Faithfull: A Life on Record (2014).

Faithfull received the World Lifetime Achievement Award at the 2009 Women's World Awards, and in 2011 she was made a Commandeur of the Ordre des Arts et des Lettres by the government of France.

== Early life ==
=== Childhood ===
Faithfull was born at the old Queen Mary's Maternity House in Hampstead, London. Her family lived in Ormskirk, Lancashire, while her father completed a doctorate at Liverpool University. She spent part of her early life in Braziers Park, Oxfordshire, at a commune formed by John Norman Glaister in which Faithfull's father played an instrumental role.

Her parents divorced when she was six. Following the divorce, Faithfull moved with her mother to Reading, Berkshire. They lived in underprivileged circumstances, and Faithfull's childhood was marred by bouts of tuberculosis. She was sent to St Joseph's Roman Catholic Convent School in Reading, Berkshire, where she was a charitably subsidised (bursaried) pupil and was for a time a weekly boarder. She was a member of the Progress Theatre's student group.

=== Ancestry ===
Faithfull's father, Major Robert Glynn Faithfull, was a British intelligence officer and professor of Italian literature at Bedford College, London University. Her mother, Eva, was the daughter of the writer Artur Wolfgang Ritter von Sacher-Masoch (1875–1953), an Austro-Hungarian nobleman. Eva was born in Budapest and moved to Vienna in 1918; she chose to style herself as Eva von Sacher-Masoch, Baroness Erisso in adulthood. She had been a ballerina for the Max Reinhardt Company during her early years, and danced in productions of works by the German theatrical duo Bertolt Brecht and Kurt Weill.

The Sacher-Masoch family secretly opposed the Nazi regime in Vienna. Faithfull's father met Eva through his intelligence work for the British Army, which brought him into contact with her family. Faithfull's maternal grandfather had aristocratic roots in the Habsburg Dynasty, and Faithfull's maternal grandmother was Jewish.

Faithfull's maternal great-great-uncle was Leopold von Sacher-Masoch, whose erotic novel Venus in Furs spawned the word "masochism". In Faithfull's appearance on the British television series Who Do You Think You Are? her roots in the Austrian nobility were discussed, and the title used by family members was said to be Ritter von Sacher-Masoch.

Faithfull's half-brother, 19 years her junior, is artist Simon Faithfull, who was the son of Robert Glynn Faithfull and his second wife, Margaret Elizabeth (Kipps) Faithfull, whom he had married in 1963.

== Singing career ==
=== 1960s ===
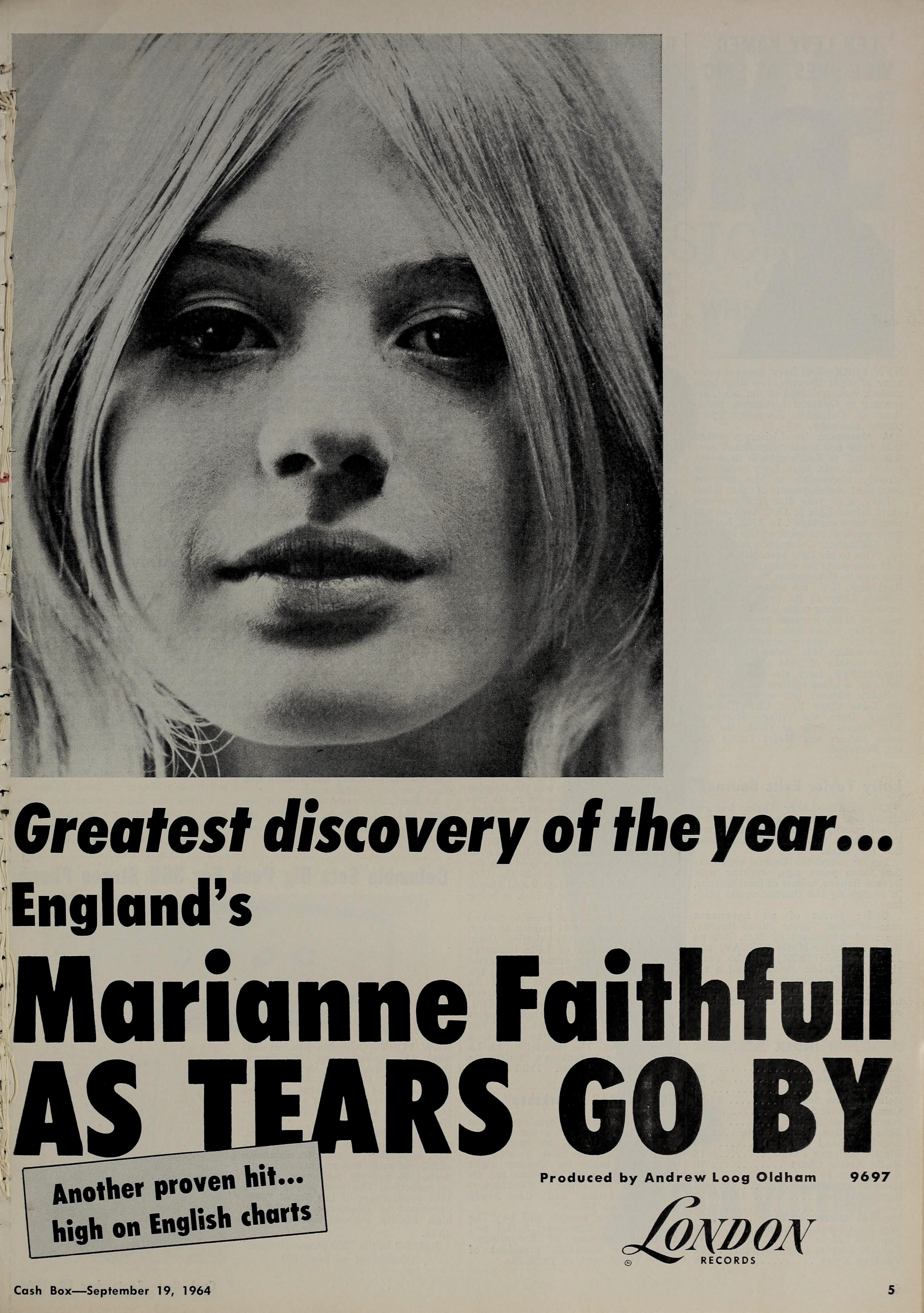
Cashbox advertisement, 19 September 1964

While still at school, Faithfull began singing folk songs a cappella in Reading's coffeehouses. In early 1964, she attended a Rolling Stones launch party with artist John Dunbar and met Andrew Loog Oldham, who 'discovered' her.

"As Tears Go By", her first single, was written by Jagger, Keith Richards, and Oldham, and became a chart success. (The Rolling Stones recorded their version one year later, which was also successful.) She then released a series of successful singles, including "This Little Bird", "Summer Nights", and "Come and Stay with Me". Faithfull married John Dunbar on 6 May 1965 in Cambridge, with Peter Asher as the best man. The couple lived in a flat at 29 Lennox Gardens in Belgravia, London SW1. On 10 November 1965, aged 18, she gave birth to their son, Nicholas.

In 1966 she took Nicholas to stay with Brian Jones and Anita Pallenberg in London. During this period, Faithfull started smoking marijuana and became best friends with Pallenberg. She began a much-publicised relationship with Mick Jagger that same year and left her husband to live with him. The couple became a notorious part of the hip Swinging London scene. Her voice is heard on The Beatles' song "Yellow Submarine". She was found wearing only a fur rug by police executing a drug search at Redlands, Keith Richards's house in West Wittering, Sussex. In an interview 27 years later with A.M. Homes for Details, Faithfull discussed her wilder days and admitted that the drug bust fur rug incident had ravaged her personal life: "It destroyed me. To be a male drug addict and to act like that is always enhancing and glamorising. A woman in that situation becomes a slut and a bad mother." It was during this time that Faithfull lost three opportunities to appear in films. "I really thought I had blown my career." In May 1967, Graham Nash, who found Marianne Faithfull "unbelievably attractive," wrote and released the hit song "Carrie Anne" with The Hollies, a track that started out as being about Faithfull. In 1968, Faithfull, by now addicted to cocaine, gave birth to a stillborn daughter (whom she had named Corrina) while returning from Jagger's country house in Ireland.

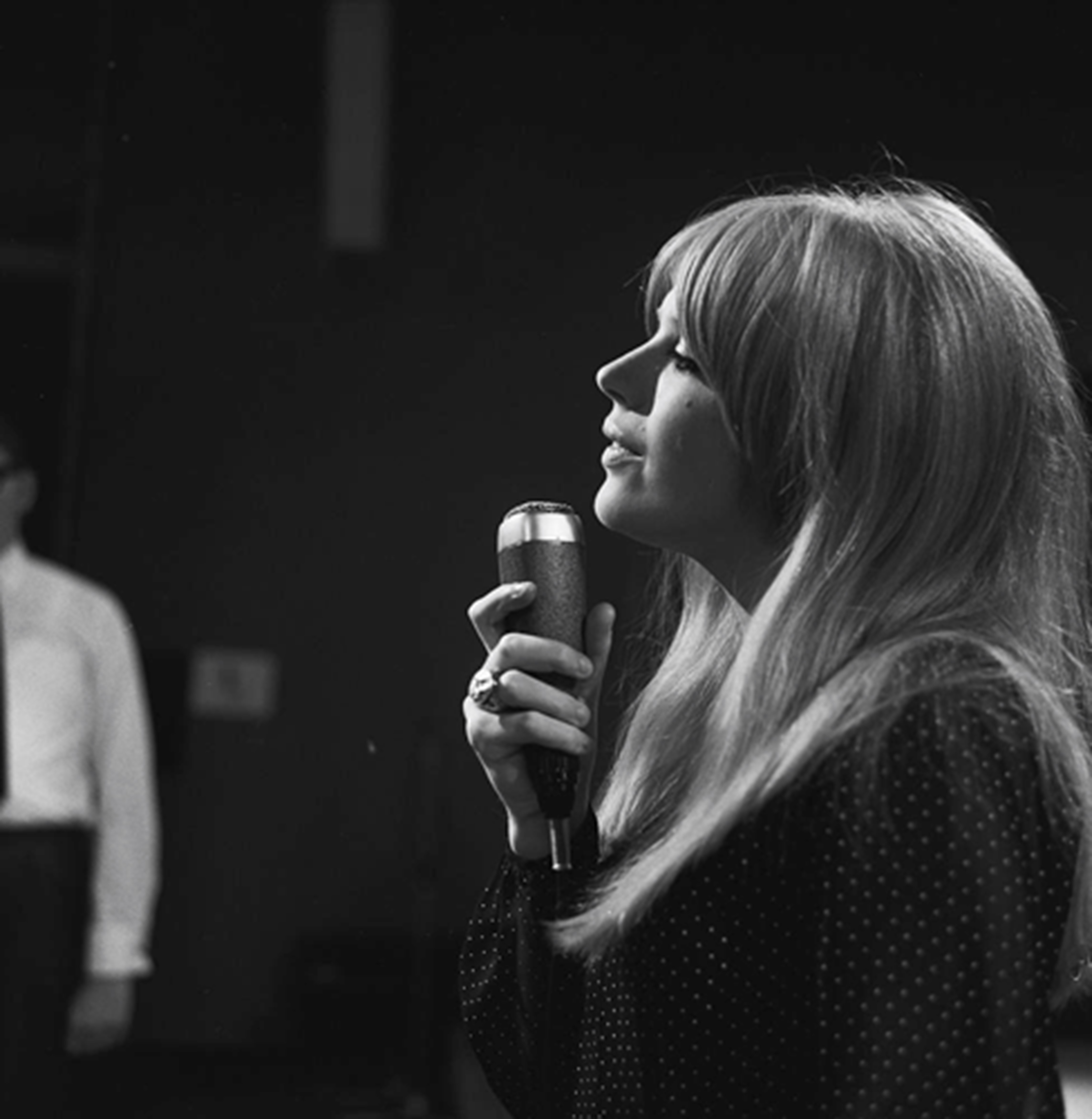
Faithfull performing on the Dutch TV programme Fanclub on 17 September 1966

Faithfull's involvement in Jagger's life was reflected in some of the Rolling Stones' best known songs. "Sympathy for the Devil", featured on the 1968 album Beggars Banquet, was partially inspired by The Master and Margarita, written by Mikhail Bulgakov, a book that Faithfull introduced to Jagger. The song "You Can't Always Get What You Want" on the 1969 album Let It Bleed was supposedly written about Faithfull; the songs "Wild Horses" and "I Got the Blues" on the 1971 album Sticky Fingers were allegedly influenced by Faithfull, and she co-wrote "Sister Morphine". The writing credit for the song was the subject of a protracted legal battle that was resolved by listing Faithfull as co-author. In her autobiography, Faithfull said Jagger and Richards released it in their own names so that her agent would not collect all the royalties and proceeds from the song, especially as she was homeless and addicted to heroin at the time. In 1968, Faithfull appeared in The Rolling Stones Rock and Roll Circus concert, giving a solo performance of "Something Better". In 1969, she went with Jagger to Australia while he filmed Ned Kelly. She attempted suicide there by taking 150 sleeping pills.

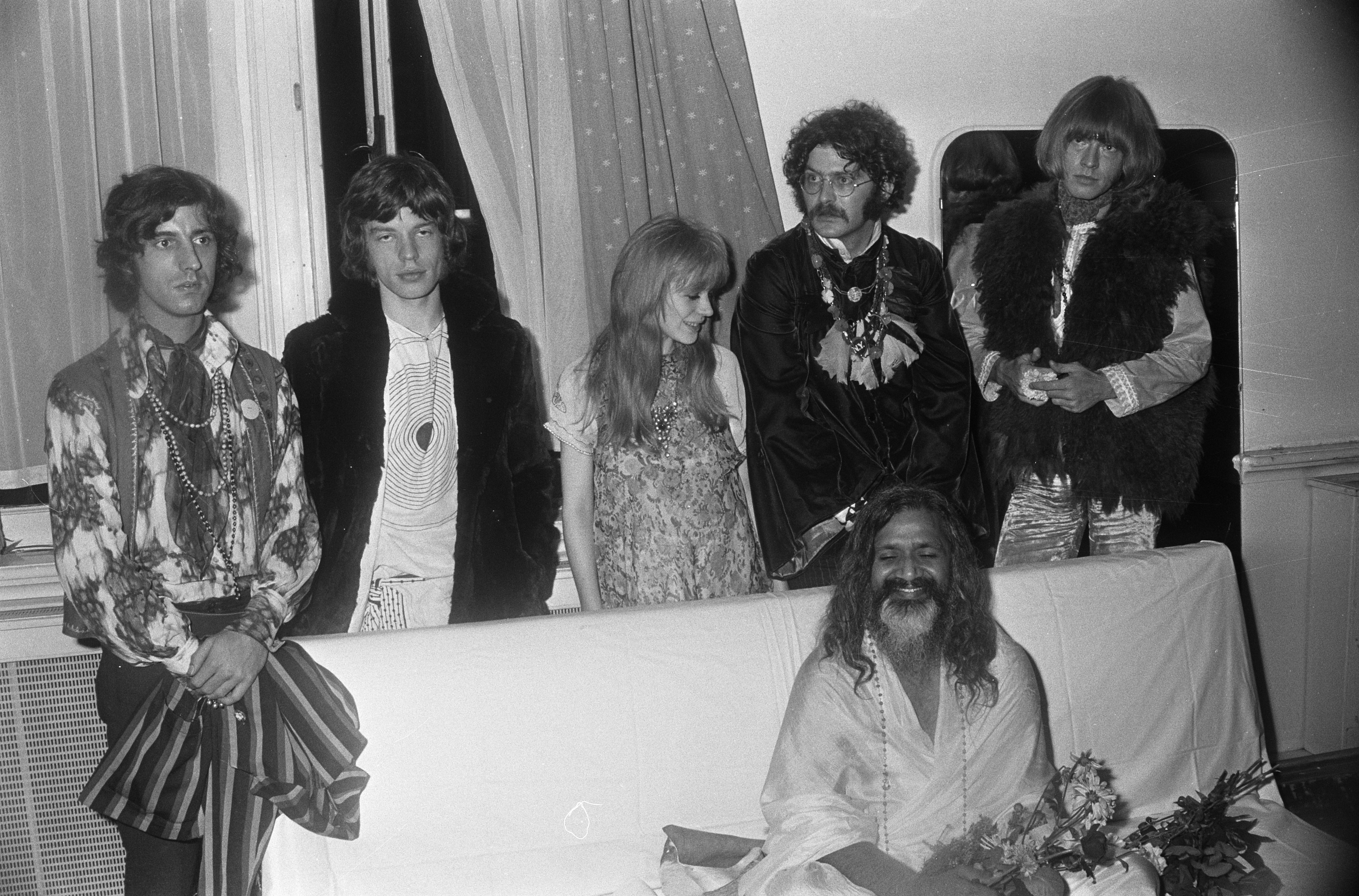
Michael Cooper, Mick Jagger, Marianne Faithfull, Shepard Sherbell, Maharishi Mahesh Yogi, and Brian Jones at the Royal Concertgebouw on 1 September 1967

=== 1970s ===
Faithfull ended her relationship with Jagger in May 1970 after starting an affair with Anglo-Irish nobleman "Paddy" Rossmore. She lost custody of her son in that same year. Faithfull's personal life went into decline and her career went into a tailspin. She made only a few public appearances, including an October 1973 performance with David Bowie singing Sonny & Cher's "I Got You Babe".

Faithfull lived on London's Soho streets for two years, suffering from heroin addiction and anorexia nervosa. Friends intervened and enrolled her in an NHS heroin-assisted treatment programme. She failed to control or stabilise her addiction. In 1971, producer Mike Leander found her on the streets and made an attempt to revive her career, producing part of her album Rich Kid Blues. The album was shelved until 1985.

In 1975, she released the country-influenced record Dreamin' My Dreams, which reached No.1 on the Irish Albums Chart. The album was re-released in 1978 as Faithless with some new tracks added. Faithfull squatted in a Chelsea flat without hot water or electricity with her then-boyfriend Ben Brierly of the band the Vibrators. She later shared flats in Chelsea and Regent's Park with Henrietta Moraes.

In 1979, the same year that she was arrested for marijuana possession in Norway, Faithfull's career returned full force with the album Broken English, her most critically hailed album. Partially influenced by the punk explosion and her marriage to Brierly in the same year, it ranged from the punk-pop sounds of the title track, which addressed terrorism in Europe (and was dedicated to Ulrike Meinhof), to the punk-reggae rhythms of "Why D'Ya Do It?", a song with aggressive lyrics adapted from a poem by Heathcote Williams. This song had a complex musical structure. On the superficial hard rock it had a tango in 4/4 time, with an opening electric guitar riff by Barry Reynolds in which beats 1 and 4 of each measure were accented on the up-beat, and beat 3 was accented on the down beat. Faithfull, in her autobiography, commented that her fluid yet rhythmic reading of Williams' lyric was "an early form of rap". Broken English was the album that revealed the full extent of Faithfull's alcohol and drug use and their effects on her singing voice, with the melodic vocals on her early records replaced by raucous, deep vocals which helped to express the raw emotions expressed in the album's songs. A disastrous February 1980 appearance on Saturday Night Live was blamed on too many rehearsals, but it was suspected that drugs had caused her voice to seize up.

"The Ballad of Lucy Jordan" was released as a single from the album in October 1979 and became one of her highest-charting songs. It later featured on the soundtracks of the films Montenegro, Tarnation and Thelma & Louise. Faithfull also performed the song during a guest appearance in an episode in the fourth season of Absolutely Fabulous. In 2016, the song was used in the finale of American Horror Story: Hotel. Faithfull discussed her interpretation of the song in a 2007 interview on ITV's The South Bank Show.

=== 1980s ===
Faithfull began living in New York City after the release of Dangerous Acquaintances in 1981. The same year, she appeared as a vocalist on the single "Misplaced Love" by Rupert Hine, which charted in Australia. Despite her comeback, in the mid-1980s she was battling with addiction and at one point tripped and broke her jaw on a flight of stairs while under the influence. Rich Kid Blues (1985) was another collection of her early work combined with new recordings, a double record showcasing both the pop and rock 'n' roll facets of her output to date. In 1985, Faithfull performed "Ballad of the Soldier's Wife" on Hal Willner's tribute album Lost in the Stars: The Music of Kurt Weill. Faithfull's restrained readings lent themselves to the material and this collaboration informed several subsequent works.

In 1985, she attended the Hazelden Foundation Clinic in Minnesota for rehabilitation and received treatment at McLean Hospital in Belmont, Massachusetts. While living at a hotel in nearby Cambridge, Massachusetts, Faithfull started an affair (while still married to Brierly) with a dual diagnosis (mentally ill and drug dependent) man, Howard Tose, who later committed suicide by jumping from a 14th floor window of the flat they shared. In the same year, Faithfull recorded a version of the 1924 blues standard "Trouble in Mind" (titled "Trouble in Mind (The Return)") for the soundtrack of Alan Rudolph’s neo-noir independent film Trouble in Mind (1985) starring Kris Kristofferson, Keith Carradine, and Lori Singer. Arranged and scored by composer Mark Isham, the track serves as the opening theme of the film. The soundtrack was released in 1986. Faithfull later performed the song live in 1988 on the late-night music television program Sunday Night (also known as Night Music), hosted by saxophonist David Sanborn. In 1987, Faithfull dedicated a "thank you" to Tose on the album sleeve of Strange Weather: "To Howard Tose with love and thanks". Faithfull's divorce from Brierly was finalised that year. In 1995, she wrote and sang about Tose's death in "Flaming September" on the album A Secret Life.

In 1987, Faithfull ventured into jazz and blues on Strange Weather, which was also produced by Willner. The album became her most critically lauded album of the decade. Coming full circle, the renewed Faithfull cut another recording of "As Tears Go By" for Strange Weather, this time in a tighter, more gravelly voice. The singer confessed to a lingering irritation with her first hit. "I always childishly thought that was where my problems started, with that damn song," she told Jay Cocks in Time magazine, but she came to terms with it as well as with her past. In a 1987 interview with Rory O'Connor of Vogue, Faithfull declared "forty is the age to sing it, not seventeen." The album of covers was produced by Hal Willner after the two had spent numerous weekends listening to hundreds of songs from 20th-century music. They chose such diverse tracks to record as Bob Dylan's "I'll Keep It with Mine" and "Yesterdays", written by Broadway composers Jerome Kern and Otto Harbach. The work included tunes first made notable by such blues luminaries as Billie Holiday and Bessie Smith; Tom Waits wrote the title track.

=== 1990s ===
When Roger Waters assembled an all-star cast of musicians to perform the rock opera The Wall live in Berlin in July 1990, Faithfull played the part of Pink's overprotective mother. Her musical career rebounded for the third time during the early 1990s with the live album Blazing Away, which featured Faithfull revisiting songs she had performed over the course of her career. Blazing Away was recorded at St. Ann's Cathedral in Brooklyn. The 13 selections include "Sister Morphine", a cover of Edith Piaf's "Les Prisons du Roy", and "Why D'Ya Do It?" from Broken English. Alanna Nash of Stereo Review commended the musicians whom Faithfull had chosen to back her: Longtime guitarist Reynolds was joined by former Band member Garth Hudson and pianist Dr. John. Nash was impressed with the album's autobiographical tone, noting that "Faithfull's gritty alto is a cracked and halting rasp, the voice of a woman who's been to hell and back on the excursion fare which, of course, she has." She extolled Faithfull as "one of the most challenging and artful of women artists," and Rolling Stone writer Fred Goodman asserted: "Blazing Away is a fine retrospective – proof that we can still expect great things from this greying, jaded contessa."

A Collection of Her Best Recordings was released in 1994 by Island Records to coincide with the release of Faithfull's autobiography; they originally shared the same cover art. The album contained Faithfull's updated version of "As Tears Go By" from Strange Weather, several cuts from Broken English and A Child's Adventure and a song written by Patti Smith which had been scheduled for inclusion on an Irish AIDS benefit album. This track, "Ghost Dance", suggested to Faithfull by a friend who later died of AIDS, was made with a trio of old friends; Stones' drummer Charlie Watts and guitarist Ron Wood backed Faithfull's vocals on the song and Keith Richards co-produced it. The retrospective album featured one live track, "Times Square", from Blazing Away, as well as the Faithfull original "She", written with composer and arranger Angelo Badalamenti. It was released the following year on A Secret Life, with additional songs co-written with Badalamenti. Faithfull sang "Love Is Teasin", an Irish folk standard, with The Chieftains on their album The Long Black Veil, released in 1995. During this time she sang a duet with John Prine on the song "This Love Is Real" on Prine's album Lost Dogs and Mixed Blessings. Faithfull sang a duet and recited text on the San Francisco band Oxbow's 1997 album Serenade in Red. She sang interlude vocals on Metallica's song "The Memory Remains" on their 1997 album Reload and appeared in the song's music video. The track reached No.13 in the UK, No. 28 in the U.S. (No.3 on the U.S. Mainstream Rock chart).

As her fascination with the music of Weimar-era Germany continued, Faithfull performed in The Threepenny Opera at the Gate Theatre, Dublin, playing Pirate Jenny. Her interpretation of the music led to a new album, Twentieth Century Blues (1996), which focused on the music of Kurt Weill and Bertolt Brecht as well as Noël Coward, followed in 1998 by a recording of The Seven Deadly Sins with the Vienna Radio Symphony Orchestra, conducted by Dennis Russell Davies. A hugely successful concert and cabaret tour, accompanied by pianist Paul Trueblood, culminated in the filming at the Montreal Jazz Festival of the DVD Marianne Faithfull Sings Kurt Weill.

In 1998, Faithfull released A Perfect Stranger: The Island Anthology, a two-disc compilation that chronicled her years with Island Records. It featured tracks from her albums Broken English, Dangerous Acquaintances, A Child's Adventure, Strange Weather, Blazing Away, and A Secret Life, as well as several B sides and unreleased tracks.

Faithfull's 1999 DVD Dreaming My Dreams contained material about her childhood and parents, with historical video footage going back to 1964, and included interviews with the artist and several friends who had known her since childhood. The documentary included sections on her relationship with John Dunbar and Mick Jagger, and brief interviews with Keith Richards. It concluded with footage from a 30-minute live concert, originally broadcast on PBS for the series Sessions at West 54th. The same year, she ranked 25th in VH1's 100 Greatest Women in Rock and Roll.

Roger Waters of Pink Floyd wrote the song "Incarceration of a Flower Child" as a portrayal of Syd Barrett in 1968, although it was never recorded by Pink Floyd. The song was recorded by Faithfull on her 1999 album Vagabond Ways.

=== 2000s ===
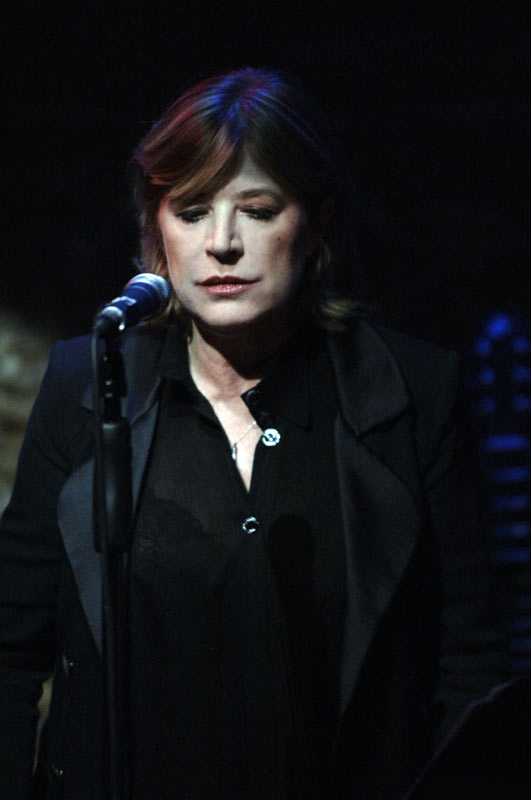
Faithfull performing in 2008

Faithfull released several albums from the late 1990s into the 2000s that received positive critical response, beginning with Vagabond Ways (1999), which was produced and recorded by Mark Howard. Vagabond Ways included collaborations with Daniel Lanois, Emmylou Harris, Roger Waters, and writer and friend Frank McGuinness. Later that year she sang "Love Got Lost" on Joe Jackson's Night and Day II.

Her renaissance continued with Kissin Time, released in 2002. The album contained songs written with Blur, Beck, Billy Corgan, Jarvis Cocker, Dave Stewart, David Courts and the French pop singer Étienne Daho. On this record, she paid tribute to Nico (with "Song for Nico"), whose work she admired. The album included an autobiographical song she co-wrote with Cocker, called "Sliding Through Life on Charm".

In 2005, she released Before the Poison. The album was primarily a collaboration with PJ Harvey and Nick Cave; Damon Albarn and Jon Brion also contributed. Before the Poison received mixed reviews from both Rolling Stone and Village Voice. In 2005 she recorded and co-produced "Lola R Forever", a cover of the Serge Gainsbourg song "Lola Rastaquouere" with Sly and Robbie for the tribute album Monsieur Gainsbourg Revisited. In 2007, Faithfull collaborated with the British singer-songwriter Patrick Wolf on the duet "Magpie" from his third album The Magic Position, and wrote and recorded a new song for the French film Truands called "A Lean and Hungry Look" with Ulysse.

In March 2007, she returned to the stage with a touring show titled Songs of Innocence and Experience. Supported by a trio, the performance had a semi-acoustic feel and toured European theatres throughout the spring and summer. The show featured many songs she had not performed live before, including "Something Better", the song she sang on The Rolling Stones Rock and Roll Circus. The show included the Harry Nilsson song "Don't Forget Me", "Marathon Kiss" from Vagabond Ways, and a version of the traditional "Spike Driver Blues". On 4 November 2007, the European Film Academy announced that Faithfull had received a nomination for Best Actress for her role as Maggie in Irina Palm.

Articles published at that time hinted that Faithfull was looking to retire and was hoping that money from Songs of the Innocence and Experience would enable her to live in comfort. She said: "I'm not prepared to be 70 and absolutely broke. I realised last year that I have no safety net at all and I'm going to have to get one. So I need to change my attitude to life, which means I have to put away 10 per cent every year of my old age. I want to be in a position where I don't have to work. I should have thought about this a long time ago but I didn't." She still lived in her flat located on one of the richest Parisian avenues and had a house in County Waterford, Ireland. Recording of Easy Come, Easy Go commenced in New York City on 6 December 2007; the album was produced by Hal Willner, who had recorded Strange Weather in 1997. and featured a version of Morrissey's "Dear God Please Help Me" from his 2006 album Ringleader of the Tormentors. In March 2009, she performed "The Crane Wife 3" on The Late Show. In late March, Faithfull began the Easy Come, Easy Go tour, which took her to France, Germany, Austria, New York City, Los Angeles and London.

In November, Faithfull was interviewed by Jennifer Davies on World Radio Switzerland, where she described the challenges of being stereotyped as a "mother, or the pure wife". Because of this, she insisted, it had been hard to maintain a long career as a female artist, which, she said, gave her empathy for Amy Winehouse when they had met recently.

On 5 March 2009, Faithfull received the World Arts Award for Lifetime Achievement at the 2009 Women's World Awards. "Marianne's contribution to the arts over a 45-year career including 18 studio albums as a singer, songwriter and interpreter, and numerous appearances on stage and screen is now being acknowledged with this special award." The award was presented in Vienna, with ceremonies televised in over 40 countries on 8 March 2009 as part of International Women's Day.

On 26 October 2009, Faithfull was honoured with the Icon of the Year award from Q magazine.

=== 2010s ===
On 31 January 2011, Faithfull released her 18th studio album, Horses and High Heels, in mainland Europe to mixed reviews. The 13-track album contained four songs co-written by Faithfull; the rest were mainly covers of well-known songs such as Dusty Springfield's "Goin' Back" and the Shangri-Las' "Past, Present, Future". A UK CD release was planned for 7 March 2011. Faithfull supported the album's release with an extensive European tour with a five-piece band and arrived in the UK on 24 May for a rare show at London's Barbican Centre, with an extra UK show added at Leamington Spa on 26 May.

On 23 March 2011, Faithfull was awarded the Commandeur of the Ordre des Arts et des Lettres, one of France's highest cultural honours. On 7 May 2011, she appeared on the Graham Norton Show. She reunited with Metallica in December 2011 for their 30th anniversary celebration at the Fillmore where she performed "The Memory Remains".

In 2012, Faithfull recorded a cover version of a Stevie Nicks track from the Fleetwood Mac album Tusk as part of a Fleetwood Mac tribute project. The track, "Angel", was released on 14 August 2012 as part of the tribute album Just Tell Me That You Want Me. On 22 June 2013, she made a sell-out concert appearance at the Queen Elizabeth Hall, with jazz musician Bill Frisell playing guitar, as a part of the Meltdown Festival curated by Yoko Ono. In September 2014, Faithfull released an album of all-new material, titled Give My Love to London. She started a 12-month 50th anniversary tour at the end of 2014.

During a webchat hosted by The Guardian on 1 February 2016, Faithfull revealed plans to release a live album from her 50th anniversary tour. She had ideas for a follow-up for Give My Love to London, but had no intention of recording new material for at least a year and a half. Faithfull's album Negative Capability, was released in November 2018. It featured Rob Ellis, Warren Ellis, Nick Cave, Ed Harcourt, and Mark Lanegan. In 2019, Faithfull recited May Sarton’s poem "Prayer Before Work on the song Galleon Ship", for the album Ghosteen by Nick Cave & the Bad Seeds.

=== 2020s ===
A spoken word album titled She Walks in Beauty was released in May 2021. Faithfull was accompanied with musical arrangements by Warren Ellis, Brian Eno, Nick Cave and Vincent Segal. The album saw her recite 19th-century British Romantic poets. The same year, she started working on the biographical documentary Broken English by Iain Forsyth and Jane Pollard; featuring Faithfull's last ever singing performance, it premiered at the 82nd Venice International Film Festival. On 14 March 2025, the single "Burning Moonlight", which was co-written by Faithfull, was released posthumously; the single is from an EP of the same name, which was released for Record Store Day later in 2025. The EP also features a re-recorded version of "She Moved Thru' the Fair", a song Faithfull previously recorded in 1966.

== Achievements ==
In 1999, Faithfull ranked 25th on VH1's 100 Greatest Women of Rock and Roll. In 2023, Rolling Stone ranked her at number 173 on its list of the 200 Greatest Singers of All Time.

=== Awards and nominations ===
Award	Year	Nominee(s)	Category	Result	Ref.
European Film Awards	2007	Irina Palm	Best Actress	Nominated	
Grammy Awards	1981	Broken English	Best Female Rock Vocal Performance	Nominated	
Q Awards	2009	Herself	Q Icon	Won	
Women's World Award	2009	Herself	Lifetime Achievement Award	Won	

== Discography ==
Studio albums

- Marianne Faithfull (1965)
- Come My Way (1965)
- Go Away from My World (1965)
- North Country Maid (1966)
- Faithfull Forever (1966)
- Love in a Mist (1967)
- Dreamin' My Dreams (1976)
- Broken English (1979)
- Dangerous Acquaintances (1981)
- A Child's Adventure (1983)
- Rich Kid Blues (1985)
- Strange Weather (1987)
- A Secret Life (1995)
- The Seven Deadly Sins (1998)
- Vagabond Ways (1999)
- Kissin Time (2002)
- Before the Poison (2004)
- Easy Come, Easy Go (2008)
- Horses and High Heels (2011)
- Give My Love to London (2014)
- Negative Capability (2018)
- She Walks in Beauty (2021)

== Acting career ==
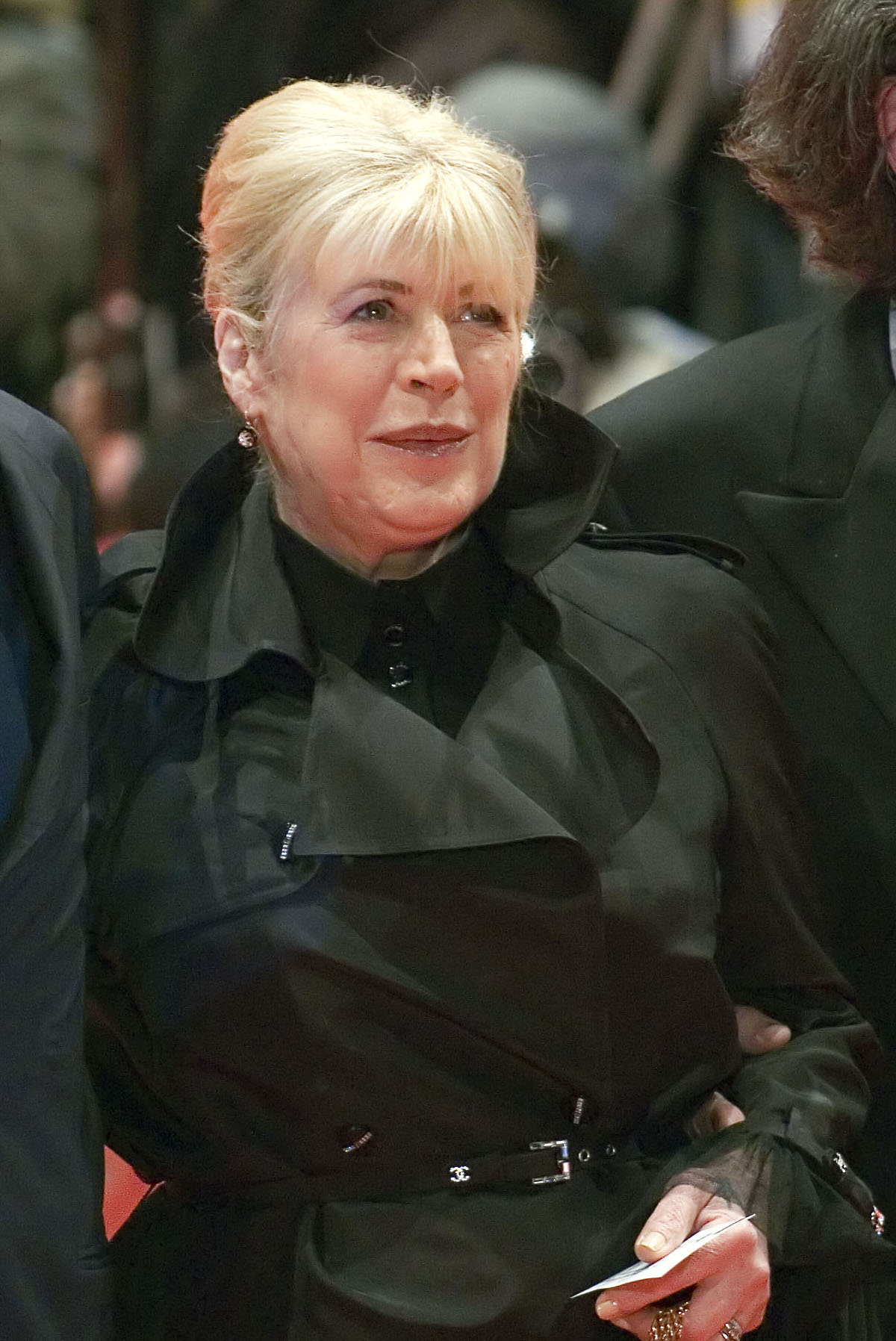
Faithfull at the premiere of Irina Palm, at the 57th Berlin International Film Festival in 2007

In addition to her music career, Faithfull had a career as an actress in theatre, television and film. Her first professional theatre appearance was in a 1967 stage adaptation of Chekhov's Three Sisters at the Royal Court Theatre, London, in which she played Irina, co-starring with Glenda Jackson and Avril Elgar. The previous year she had played herself in Jean-Luc Godard's film Made in U.S.A.. Faithfull was also featured in the 1967 film I'll Never Forget What's'isname. In the French television film Anna, she sang Serge Gainsbourg's "Hier ou Demain". In 1968, she starred as a black leather-clad motorcyclist in the film The Girl on a Motorcycle (also known as La Motocyclette and Naked Under Leather). It was thanks to this film, starring Alain Delon, that Faithfull became famous in France. The film was preceded by a widely discussed photograph by Paris Match photographer Patrice Habans capturing her beaming as she conversed with Alain Delon, seated to her left, while her then-partner Mick Jagger sat on her other side. She also played in Kenneth Anger's Lucifer Rising. In London 1969 at the Round House, Faithfull played Ophelia in Hamlet, later filmed as Hamlet.

Faithfull's stage work included Edward Bond's Early Morning at the Royal Court Theatre, London, in which she played a lesbian Florence Nightingale; The Collector at St Martin's Theatre in the West End Mad Dog at Hampstead Theatre; A Patriot for Me by John Osborne, at the Palace Theatre; and the role of Lizzie Curry in N. Richard Nash's The Rainmaker, which toured the UK. Her other film roles during the 1970s included Sophy Kwykwer in Stephen Weeks's Ghost Story (AKA Madhouse Mansion); and Helen Rochefort in Assault on Agathon.

Her television acting in the late 1960s and early 1970s included The Door of Opportunity (1970), adapted from W. Somerset Maugham's story, followed by August Strindberg's The Stronger (1971), and Terrible Jim Fitch (1971) by James Leo Herlihy. In 1991, she played the role of Pirate Jenny in The Threepenny Opera at the Gate Theatre in Dublin. Later she performed Kurt Weill's "The Seven Deadly Sins" with the Vienna Radio Symphony Orchestra, a CD of which was released in 1998.

Faithfull played both God and the Devil. She appeared as God in two guest appearances on the British sitcom Absolutely Fabulous. In 2004 and 2005, she played the Devil in William Burroughs' and Tom Waits' musical The Black Rider, directed by Robert Wilson, which opened at London's Barbican Theatre. In 2001, Faithfull appeared in C.S. Leigh's Far from China. She appeared in Patrice Chéreau's Intimacy (2001), and in 2004, in Jose Hayot's Nord-Plage. She appeared as Empress Maria Theresa in Sofia Coppola's 2006 biopic Marie Antoinette.

Faithfull starred in the film Irina Palm, released at the Berlinale film festival in 2007. She played the central role of Maggie, a 60-year-old widow who becomes a sex worker to pay for medical treatment for her ill grandson. Faithfull was nominated for the European Film Award for Best Actress for her work in the film. She lent her voice to the 2008 film Evil Calls: The Raven, but it was recorded several years earlier when the project was titled Alone in the Dark. She appeared in the 2008 feature documentary by Nik Sheehan on Brion Gysin and the dreamachine, titled FLicKeR.

In 2008, Faithfull toured readings of Shakespeare's sonnets, drawing on the "Dark Lady" sequence. Her accompanist was the cellist Vincent Ségal. In 2011 and 2012, Faithfull had supporting roles in the films Faces in the Crowd and the film Belle du Seigneur. Faithfull starred in a production of Kurt Weill's The Seven Deadly Sins at Landestheater Linz, Austria. The production ran from October 2012 to January 2013. On 18 September 2013, Faithfull was featured in the genealogy documentary series Who Do You Think You Are?, tracing her family's roots, in particular her mother's side of the family in pre-World War II Austria.

=== TV and filmography ===
Year	Film	Role	Notes
1966	Made in U.S.A	Herself	Sang "As Tears Go By" in a cafe
1967	Anna (TV movie)	Une jeune femme dans la soirée dansante	
1967	I'll Never Forget What's'isname	Josie	Faithfull became the first person to say "fuck" in a mainstream studio picture.
1968	The Girl on a Motorcycle	Rebecca	
1969	Hamlet	Ophelia	
1971	The Stronger (TV movie)		Directed by Patrick Garland, also starred Britt Ekland
1972	Lucifer Rising (Short)	Lilith	
1974	Ghost Story	Sophy Kwykwer	
1975	Assault on Agathon	Helen Rochefort	
1992	The Turn of the Screw	Narrator	
1993	When Pigs Fly	Lilly	
1994	Shopping	Bev	
1995	Moondance	Mother	Additionally provided the vocals for "Madam George"
1996	Crimetime	Club Singer	
2001	Intimacy	Betty	
2001	Far from China	Helen	
2001	Absolutely Fabulous (TV series)	God	– "The Last Shout: Part 1" (1996) – "The Last Shout: Part 2" (1996) – "Donkey" (2001)
2004	A Letter to True	Narrator	Documentary, written and directed by Bruce Weber, released in the U.K. in 2008
2006	Paris, je t'aime	Marianne	Segment: "Le Marais"
2006	Marie Antoinette	Empress Maria Theresa	
2007	Irina Palm	Maggie	Nominated for European Film Award for Best Actress
2011	Faces in the Crowd	Dr. Langenkamp	
2012	Belle du Seigneur	Mariette	
2013	Who Do You Think You Are? (TV series)	Herself	Series 10, episode 9
2021	Dune	Bene Gesserit Ancestor (voice)	
2023	Wild Summon	Narrator (voice)	
2025	Broken English	Herself	A documentary/docufiction that explores Faithfull's life, career, and legacy.
2026	Making Marie Antoinette	Herself	Behind the scenes documentary about the 2006 film Marie Antoinette

=== Stage work ===
Year	Production	Role	Location	Notes
1967	Three Sisters	Irina	Royal Court Theatre, London	
1968	Early Morning	Florence Nightingale	Royal Court Theatre, London	
1969	Hamlet	Ophelia	The Roundhouse, London	
1973	Alice in Wonderland	Alice	Theatre Royal, Brighton	
1973	A Patriot for Me	Countess Sophia Delyanoff	Palace Theatre, Watford	
1973	Mad Dog	Jane Ludlow; Little Ford Fauntleroy (disguised)	Hampstead Theatre, London	
1974	The Collector	Miranda	Wyvern Theatre, Swindon, and St. Martin's Theatre, London	
1975	The Rainmaker	Lizzie Curry	Kenneth More Theatre, Ilford, and UK tour	
1975	The Kingdom of Earth	Myrtle Ravenstock	Greenwood Theatre, London	
1991	The Threepenny Opera	Pirate Jenny	Gate Theatre, Dublin	
2004	The Black Rider	Pegleg	Barbican Centre, London	

== Works as an author ==
- Faithfull: An Autobiography, Marianne Faithfull (1994), Cooper Square Press
- Memories, Dreams & Reflections, Marianne Faithfull (7 July 2008), Harper Perennial
- Marianne Faithfull: A Life on Record, edited by Marianne Faithfull and Francois Ravard, Contribution by Will Self and Terry Southern, Introduction by Salman Rushdie (2014), Rizzoli

== Personal life ==
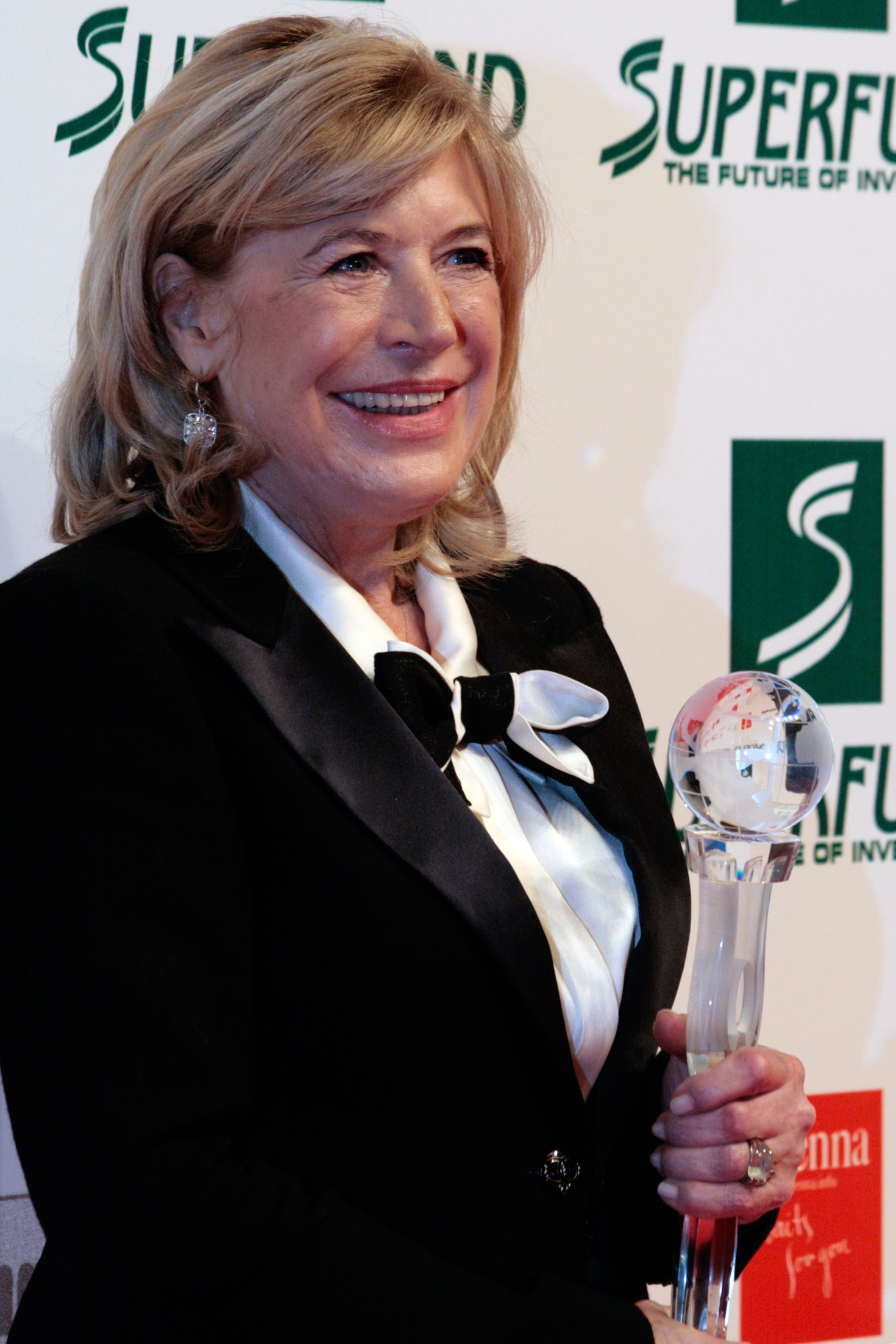
Faithfull at the Women's World Awards in 2009

During the 1960s, Faithfull had relationships with both men and women. In 1965, Faithfull married the artist and gallerist John Dunbar. The couple had a son, Nicholas Dunbar, when Faithfull was 18. From 1966 to 1970, she had a highly publicised romantic relationship with Mick Jagger. The year it disintegrated, she suffered a miscarriage. When she also lost custody of her son, she attempted suicide and fell into heroin addiction. After splitting with Jagger, she dated Jean de Breteuil, whom she later blamed for accidentally causing Jim Morrison's death.

Faithfull had three miscarriages and four abortions. The first abortion was in 1964, after she had become pregnant by Gene Pitney; the procedure was still illegal in the United Kingdom at the time. Faithfull later stated that she had a hard time dealing with the guilt, and that she began to feel better once her son Nicholas was born the year after. Subsequent terminations were from her period of drug abuse, which she explained she chose because did not wish for the children to be born as addicts.

In 1979 she married musician Ben Brierly; they divorced in 1986. She was married to actor Giorgio della Terza from 1988 until 1991.

=== Health and death ===
In later years, Faithfull's touring and work schedule were interrupted by health problems. In late 2004, she called off the European leg of a world tour promoting Before the Poison, after collapsing on stage in Milan and being hospitalised with exhaustion. In 2005, the tour resumed to include a U.S. leg. In September 2006, she again cancelled a concert tour, this time after receiving a breast cancer diagnosis. The following month, she underwent surgery in France, but required no further treatment, as the tumour had been caught rather early. Less than two months later, she made a public statement announcing her full recovery.

In October 2007, on the UK television program This Morning, Faithfull disclosed that she suffered from hepatitis C, having first been diagnosed 12 years earlier. She discussed both the cancer and hepatitis diagnoses in greater depth in her memoir Memories, Dreams and Reflections. On 27 May 2008, she posted the following on her MySpace page, with the headline "Tour Dates Cancelled" (and credited to FR Management, the company operated by her boyfriend/manager François Ravard): "Due to general mental, physical, and nervous exhaustion, doctors have ordered Marianne Faithfull to immediately cease all work activities and rehabilitate. The treatment and recovery should last around six months."

In August 2013, Faithfull was forced to cancel a string of concerts in the U.S. and Lebanon after suffering a back injury on holiday in California.

On 30 May 2014, Faithfull fell while vacationing on the Greek island of Rhodes, suffering a broken hip for which she underwent surgery. Afterwards, an infection developed, causing Faithfull to cancel or postpone parts of her 50th anniversary tour so that she could receive additional surgery and rehabilitation.

In 2016, she revealed she had emphysema, a lung disease commonly induced by smoking, and needed to use inhaled medication daily. She continued to smoke, however, and was not able to quit until 2019, later expressing regret that she had not done so sooner.

On 4 April 2020, it was announced that Faithfull was hospitalised in London for pneumonia following a positive COVID-19 test. She was proclaimed "stable and responding to treatment", and was discharged from hospital after three weeks. She initially thought she would be unable to sing again after the effects of the COVID-19 on her lungs; she also continued to suffer memory loss. She worked on her breathing and undertook singing practice as part of her recovery. In March 2022, Faithfull was moved into Denville Hall, a British retirement home for the rich and famous.

Faithfull died in London on 30 January 2025, at the age of 78. She is buried at St Mary's Church, Aldworth, Berkshire.
