= Marianne Faithfull discography =

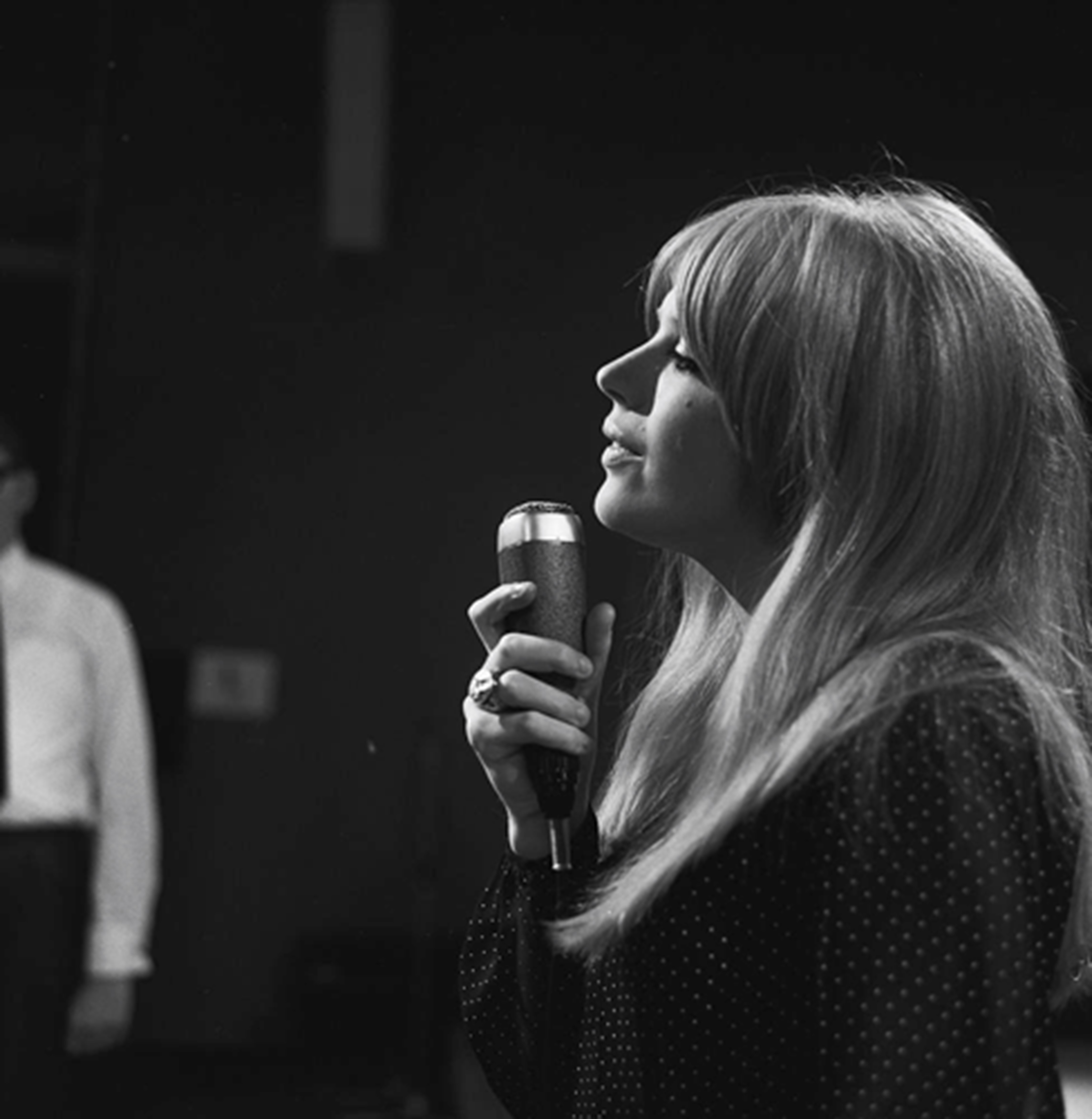
Marianne Faithfull in 1966

This is the discography of British singer Marianne Faithfull (1946–2025).

== Albums ==
=== Studio albums ===
Title	Album details	Peak chart positions												Certifications
Title	Album details	UK	AUS	AUT	BEL (FL)	BEL (WA)	FRA	GER	NL	NZ	SWE	SWI	US	Certifications
Marianne Faithfull	Released: 15 April 1965; UK label: Decca; US label: London	15	—	—	—	—	—	—	—	—	—	—	12	
Come My Way	Released: 15 April 1965 (UK only); Label: Decca	12	—	—	—	—	—	—	—	—	—	—	—	
Go Away from My World	Released: December 1965 (US only); Label: London	—	—	—	—	—	—	—	—	—	—	—	81	
North Country Maid	Released: 1 April 1966 (UK only); Label: Decca	—	—	—	—	—	—	—	—	—	—	—	—	
Faithfull Forever	Released: September 1966 (US only); Label: London	—	—	—	—	—	—	—	—	—	—	—	147	
Love in a Mist	Released: 2 March 1967 (UK only); Label: Decca	—	—	—	—	—	—	—	—	—	—	—	—	
Dreamin' My Dreams (re-released as Faithless with four new tracks added)	Released: 1976 (Dreamin' My Dreams) / 1978 (Faithless); Label: NEMS Records	—	—	—	—	—	—	—	—	—	—	—	—	
Broken English	Released: 2 November 1979; Label: Island	57	27	3	—	—	—	4	37	2	4	—	82	AUS: Platinum; CAN: Platinum; FRA: Gold; BPI: Silver
Dangerous Acquaintances	Released: 1 September 1981; Label: Island	45	24	—	—	—	—	—	33	7	4	—	104	AUS: Gold; CAN: Gold; FRA: Gold
A Child's Adventure	Released: March 1983; Label: Island	99	14	—	—	—	—	60	43	15	9	—	107	AUS: Gold
Rich Kid Blues	Recorded: 1971; Released: 1985; Label: Castle	—	—	—	—	—	—	—	—	—	—	—	—	
Strange Weather	Released: July 1987; Label: Island	78	48	—	—	—	—	—	45	16	32	—	—	
A Secret Life	Released: 21 March 1995; Label: Island	—	—	—	—	—	—	—	—	—	—	—	—	
The Seven Deadly Sins	Released: 15 September 1998; Label: RCA Victor	—	—	—	—	—	—	—	—	—	—	—	— (Note: The Seven Deadly Sins did not enter the Billboard 200, but it peaked at #38 on the Billboard Classical Albums chart.)	
Vagabond Ways	Released: 14 April 1999; Label: Instinct Records/EMI	86	—	—	—	—	75	—	—	—	—	—	—	
Kissin Time	Released: 19 February 2002; Label: Hut/Virgin	—	—	42	40	—	39	49	—	—	—	47	—	
Before the Poison	Released: 28 September 2004; Label: Naïve	— (Note: Before the Poison did not enter the UK Albums Chart, but it peaked at #24 on the UK Independent Albums Charts.)	—	—	29	39	31	—	—	—	—	61	— (Note: Before the Poison did not enter the Billboard 200, but it peaked at #37 on the Billboard Independent Albums chart.)	IMPALA: Gold
Easy Come, Easy Go	Released: 10 November 2008; Label: Naïve, Dramatico	100	—	—	38	71	35	51	52	—	58	28	182	IMPALA: Gold
Horses and High Heels	Released: 31 January 2011; Label: Naïve, Dramatico	— (Note: Horses and High Heels did not enter the UK Albums Chart, but it peaked at #16 on the UK Independent Albums Charts.)	—	68	46	56	37	35	78	—	34	26	—	IMPALA: 2 x Silver
Give My Love to London	Released: 29 September 2014; Label: Naïve, Dramatico	64	—	—	31	42	16	60	51	—	—	25	—	
Negative Capability	Released: 2 November 2018; Label: Panta Rei	44	—	20	12	43	59	27	34	—	—	14	— (Note: Negative Capability did not enter the Billboard 200, but it peaked at number 38 on the Billboard Independent Albums chart.)	
She Walks in Beauty (with Warren Ellis)	Released: 30 April 2021; Label: Panta Rei / BMG	88	—	21	38	37	—	28	49	—	—	28	—	

=== Live albums ===
Title	Album details	Peak chart positions									
Title	Album details	AUS	AUT	BEL (FL)	NL	FRA	NZ	SCO	SWE	SWI	US
Blazing Away	Released: 1990; Label: Island	66	28	—	75	—	19	—	44	—	160
20th Century Blues	Released: 1996; Label: RCA Victor	—	—	—	—	—	—	—	—	—	-
Live at the BBC	Recorded: 1965–1966; Released: 2008; Label: Decca / Universal Music Group	—	—	—	—	—	—	—	—	—	-
No Exit	Released: 2016; Label: Verycords	—	—	90	—	199	—	—	—	—	—
The Montreux Years	Recorded: 1995–2009; Released: 2021; Label: BMG	—	—	—	—	—	—	83	-	37	—

=== Select compilation albums ===
Title	Album details	Peak chart positions	
Title	Album details	NZ	US
The World of Marianne Faithfull (UK title) / Marianne Faithfull's Greatest Hits (US title)	Released: 1969; UK label: Decca; US label: London	—	171
The Very Best of Marianne Faithfull	Released: 1987; Label: London	—	—
Faithfull: A Collection of Her Best Recordings	Released: 1994; Label: Island	12	—
A Perfect Stranger: The Island Anthology	Released: 1998; Label: Island	—	—
A Stranger on Earth: An Introduction to Marianne Faithfull	Released: 2001; Label: Decca	—	—
Come and Stay with Me: The UK 45s 1964 - 1969	Released: 2018; UK label: Ace; US label: ABKCO	—	—
Songs of Innocence and Experience 1965 - 1995	Released: 2022; Label: Universal Music Group	—	—

== EPs ==
Title	EP details	Peak chart positions
Title	EP details	UK
Go Away from My World	Released: 28 May 1965 (UK only); Label: Decca	4
Spring Blossoms	Released: 21 April 2023; Label: ABKCO Music & Records	-

== Singles ==
Title (with UK B-sides)	Year	Peak chart positions													Album (UK versions)
Title (with UK B-sides)	Year	UK	AUS	AUT	BEL (FL)	BEL (W)	FRA	GER	IRE	NLD	NZ	SWE	SWI	US	Album (UK versions)
"As Tears Go By" b/w "Greensleeves" (Non-album track)	1964	9	35	—	—	—	—	—	9	—	—	—	—	22	Marianne Faithfull
"Blowin' in the Wind" b/w "House of the Rising Sun" (different version to Come My Way)	1964	—	—	—	—	—	—	—	—	—	—	—	—	—	Non-album single
"Come and Stay with Me" b/w "What Have I Done Wrong"	1965	4	6	—	—	— (Note: "Come And Stay With Me" did not appear in the Ultratop 50 Singles chart, but peaked in the Ultratip chart.)	43	—	6	—	—	—	—	26	Marianne Faithfull
"This Little Bird" b/w "Morning Sun" (Non-album track)	1965	6	11	—	—	—	—	—	4	—	7	—	—	32	Love in a Mist
"Summer Nights" b/w "The Sha La La Song" (Non-album track)	1965	10	18	—	—	—	—	—	—	— (Note: "Summer Nights" did not appear in the Dutch charts but peaked at number 26 in the Top 40 charts.)	—	18	—	24	The World of Marianne Faithfull
"Yesterday" b/w "Oh Look Around You" (Non-album track)	1965	36	79	—	—	—	—	—	—	—	—	—	—	—	Love in a Mist
"Go Away from My World" b/w "Oh Look Around You" (Non-album track)	1965	—	—	—	—	—	—	—	—	—	—	—	—	89	Go Away from My World
"Quando Ballai Con Lui" (Note: Released in Italy only.)	1965	—	—	—	—	—	—	—	—	—	—	—	—	—	Non-album single
"A Bientôt Nous Deux" (Note: Released in France only.)	1965	—	—	—	—	—	—	—	—	—	—	—	—	—	A Bientôt Nous Deux E.P
"Là …Devant Toi"	1965	—	—	—	—	— (Note: "Là...devant toi" did not appear in the Ultratop 50 Singles chart, but peaked in the Ultratip chart.)	—	—	—	—	—	—	—	—	A Bientôt Nous Deux E.P
"Tomorrow's Calling" b/w "That's Right Baby" (Non-album track)	1966	—	—	—	—	—	—	—	—	—	—	—	—	—	Non-album single in the U.K. but on the European edition of Love in a Mist
"Counting" b/w "I'd Like to Dial Your Number" (Non-album track)	1966	—	—	—	—	—	—	—	—	—	—	—	—	—	Love in a Mist
"Coquillages"	1966	—	—	—	—	—	—	—	—	—	—	—	—	—	Coquillages / Si Demain E.P
"Si demain"	1966	—	—	—	—	— (Note: "Si Demain" did not appear in the Ultratop 50 Singles chart, but peaked in the Ultratip chart.)	—	—	—	—	—	—	—	—	Coquillages / Si Demain E.P
"C'è Chi Spera"	1967	—	—	—	—	—	—	—	—	—	—	—	—	—	Non-album single
"Is This What I Get for Loving You?" b/w "Tomorrow's Calling"	1967	43	42	—	—	—	—	—	—	—	—	—	—	125	Non-album single in the U.K. but on the European edition of Love in a Mist
"Scarborough Fair" (Note: Released in Japan only.)	1968	—	—	—	—	—	—	—	—	—	—	—	—	—	North Country Maid
"Something Better" b/w "Sister Morphine"	1969	—	—	—	—	—	—	—	—	—	—	—	—	—	Non-album single
"Dreamin' My Dreams" b/w "Lady Madelaine"	1975	—	—	—	—	—	—	—	1	—	—	—	—	—	Dreamin' My Dreams
"All I Wanna Do in Life" b/w "Wrong Road Again"	1976	—	—	—	—	—	—	—	11	—	—	—	—	—	Dreamin' My Dreams
"The Way You Want Me to Be" b/w "Wrong Road Again"	1978	—	—	—	—	—	—	—	—	—	—	—	—	—	Dreamin' My Dreams
"The Ballad of Lucy Jordan" b/w "Brain Drain"	1979	48	48	2	7	—	17	5	—	19 (Note: "Lucy Jordan" peaked at number 15 on the Top 40 chart.)	20	—	5	—	Broken English
"Broken English" b/w "What's the Hurry"	1980	—	75	—	—	—	—	26	—	— (Note: "Broken English" did not reach the Dutch Charts, but appeared in the Dutch Single Tip for 1 week on 8 March 1980.)	25	17	—	— (Note: "Broken English" did not enter the Billboard Hot 100, but it peaked at number 59 on the Billboard Dance Club Songs chart.)	Broken English
"Working Class Hero"	1979	—	—	—	—	—	—	—	—	—	—	—	—	—	Broken English
"Intrigue" b/w "For Beautie's Sake"	1981	—	79	—	—	—	—	—	—	—	—	—	—	—	Dangerous Acquaintances
"Sweetheart" b/w "Over Here" (Non-album track)	1981	—	69	—	29	—	45	—	—	— (Note: "Sweetheart" did not appear on the Dutch charts, but peaked in the Top 40 Tipparade chart at number 16.)	—	—	—	—	Dangerous Acquaintances
"Truth, Bitter Truth"	1981	—	—	—	—	—	—	—	—	—	—	—	—	—	Dangerous Acquaintances
"Tenderness" (Note: Released in The Netherlands only.)	1982	—	—	—	—	—	—	—	—	—	—	—	—	—	Dangerous Acquaintances
"For Beautie's Sake" (Note: Released in Japan only.)	1982	—	—	—	—	—	—	—	—	—	—	—	—	—	Dangerous Acquaintances
"Sister Morphine" b/w "Broken English" (from Broken English)	1982	—	—	—	—	—	—	—	—	—	37	—	—	—	Non-album single
"Running for Our Lives"	1983	—	40	—	—	—	36	—	—	—	—	—	—	—	A Child's Adventure
"Blue Millionaire"	1983	—	—	—	—	—	—	—	—	—	—	—	—	—	A Child's Adventure
"Times Square"	1983	—	—	—	—	—	—	—	—	—	—	—	—	—	A Child's Adventure
"As Tears Go By" (Note: 1987 version)	1987	—	—	—	—	—	—	—	—	—	—	—	—	—	Strange Weather
"Boulevard Of Broken Dreams"	1987	—	—	—	—	—	—	—	—	—	—	—	—	—	Strange Weather
"Sign of Judgement" (Note: Released in Australia only.)	1987	—	—	—	—	—	—	—	—	—	—	—	—	—	Strange Weather
"Blazing Away"	1990	—	—	—	—	—	—	—	—	—	—	—	—	—	Blazing Away
"The Ballad of Lucy Jordan" (Note: Live version)	1990	—	—	—	—	—	—	—	—	—	—	—	—	—	Blazing Away
"Madame George"	1994	—	—	—	—	—	—	—	—	—	—	—	—	—	No Prima Donna
"She" (Note: Released in The Netherlands only.)	1994	—	—	—	—	—	—	—	—	—	—	—	—	—	A Collection Of Her Best Recordings
"Bored By Dreams"	1995	—	—	—	—	—	—	—	—	—	—	—	—	—	A Secret Life
"Don’t Forget Me"	1996	—	—	—	—	—	—	—	—	—	—	—	—	—	20th Century Blues
"Hang It on Your Heart"	1997	—	—	—	—	—	—	—	—	—	—	—	—	—	Non-album single
"Vagabond Ways"	1999	—	—	—	—	—	97	—	—	—	—	—	—	—	Vagabond Ways
"Sex with Strangers"	2002	—	—	—	—	—	—	—	—	—	—	—	—	—	Kissin' Time
"Easy Come, Easy Go" (France only)	2008	—	—	—	—	—	89	—	—	—	—	—	—	—	Easy Come, Easy Go
"Why Did We Have to Part?"	2011	—	—	—	—	—	—	—	—	—	—	—	—	—	Horses and High Heels
"Sparrows Will Sing"	2014	—	—	—	—	—	—	—	—	—	—	—	—	—	Give My Love to London
"The Gypsy Faerie Queen"	2018	—	—	—	— (Note: "The Gypsy Faerie Queen" did not appear in the Ultratop 50 Singles chart, but peaked in the Ultratip chart.)	—	—	—	—	—	—	—	—	—	Negative Capability
"They Come At Night"	2019	—	—	—	— (Note: "They Come At Night" did not appear in the Ultratop 50 Singles chart, but peaked in the Ultratip chart.)	—	—	—	—	—	—	—	—	—	Negative Capability
"She Walks in Beauty"	2021	—	—	—	—	—	—	—	—	—	—	—	—	—	She Walks in Beauty
"Burning Moonlight"	2025	— (Note: "Burning Moonlight" did not enter the UK Singles Chart, but entered the Singles Sales Chart at number 66, the Physical Singles chart at number 24 and the Vinyl Singles chart at number 19.)	—	—	—	—	—	—	—	—	—	—	—	—	Burning Moonlight EP
"She Moved Thru’ The Fair"	2025	—	—	—	—	—	—	—	—	—	—	—	—	—	Burning Moonlight EP
"Love is - Head Version"	2025	—	—	—	—	—	—	—	—	—	—	—	—	—	Burning Moonlight EP
"Love is" (Note: Credited to Faithfull and Oscar Dunbar.)	2025	—	—	—	—	—	—	—	—	—	—	—	—	—	Non-album single

=== Other charted songs ===
Title	Year	Peak chart positions	Album
Title	Year	US Dance Club	Album
"Why D'Ya Do It"	1980	59	Broken English

=== Appearances ===
Main artist	Title	Year	Peak chart positions										Certifications	Album
Main artist	Title	Year	UK	AUS	GER	NLD	NOR	NZ	SWE	SWI	US	US Main. Rock	Certifications	Album
The Rolling Stones	"Sympathy for the Devil"	1968	9	4	—	—	—	—	—	—	—	—	ARIA: 3× Platinum; GER: Gold; UK: Platinum	Beggars Banquet
The Rolling Stones	"Sympathy for the Devil" (Edit)	1973	—	—	—	14	—	—	—	—	—	—		Beggars Banquet
Metallica	"The Memory Remains"	1997	13	6	20	15	3	23	4	30	28	3	RIAA: Gold; ARIA: Platinum	Reload
The Rolling Stones	"Sympathy for the Devil" (Remix)	2003	14	—	18	10	15	—	43	25	97	—		Beggars Banquet
Nick Cave and the Bad Seeds	"Galleon Ship"	2019	—	—	—	—	—	—	—	—	—	—		Ghosteen

== Contributions ==
- The Beatles: Revolver (1966, Parlophone) – "Yellow Submarine"
- The Beatles: Magical Mystery Tour (1967, Parlophone) – "All You Need Is Love"
- The Rolling Stones: Beggars Banquet (1968, Decca) – "Sympathy for the Devil"
- Rupert Hine: Immunity (1981, A&M) – "Misplaced Love"
- Tuff Turf – "Love Hates" (1985)
- Trouble in Mind (1985)
- Lost in the Stars: The Music of Kurt Weill (1985, A&M) – "Ballad of the Soldier's Wife"
- Michael Mantler: Many Have No Speech (1988, 13 tracks)
- The Wall – Live in Berlin (1990, Mercury) – Pink's Mother in "The Trial" with Roger Waters, Tim Curry, Thomas Dolby, Ute Lemper and Albert Finney
- The Bells of Dublin (1991, RCA Records) – "I Saw Three Ships" (with The Chieftains)
- Ismaël Lô: Jammu Africa (1995) – "Without Blame" (written by Roger Waters)
- The Chieftains: The Long Black Veil (1995, RCA Records) – "Love is Teasin'"
- The City of Lost Children (1995) – "Who Will Take My Dreams Away")
- Oxbow: Serenade In Red (1996) – "Over" & "Insylum"
- Twentieth-Century Blues: The Songs of Noël Coward (1998) – "Mad About the Boy"
- Emmaus Mouvement (1999, Virgin France) – Emmaus Mouvement 50th anniversary record – Shakespeare's "Sonnet 14"
- Joe Jackson: Night and Day II (2000, Sony Classical Records) – "Love Got Lost"
- The L Word (2004, Tommy Boy) – "The Pleasure Song"
- Monsieur Gainsbourg Revisited (2005, Virgin/Verve Forecest) – "Lola R. For Ever" (with Sly and Robbie)
- The Magic Position (2007) – "Magpie" (with Patrick Wolf)
- From Gainsbourg to Lulu (2011) – "Manon" (with Lulu Gainsbourg)
- Chimes of Freedom: The Songs of Bob Dylan Honoring 50 Years of Amnesty International (2012, Fontana Distribution) – "Baby, Let Me Follow You Down (Live)"
- Son of Rogues Gallery: Pirate Ballads, Sea Songs & Chanteys (2013) – "Flandyke Shore" (with Kate & Anna McGarrigle)
- The Rarities Collection (2015)

== Tribute albums ==
- The Faithful: A Tribute to Marianne Faithfull (2023)
