= François Ravard =

French record and film producer (born 1957)

François Ravard (born April 26, 1957) is a French record and film producer.

== Early life ==
François Ravard was born on April 26, 1957. His parents are Nadine Milhet and Jacques Ravard. His father, member of the production team of a performance of The Bald Soprano (a play by Ionesco), took him backstage as a child. His vocation sprang from that event.

In 1975, at the Lycée Edgar-Poe, Ravard met Olivier Caudron - aka Olive - who introduced him to Jean-Louis Aubert. The three of them became friends and shared an apartment the year after, located on avenue Frémiet, in Paris.

== Téléphone ==
In November the four members of the band that became Téléphone appeared on American Center stage. François Ravard and Olive promoted the gig by painting the graffiti "concert rock!" in the city.

A few months and gigs later, Ravard became the band's manager. He was "the fifth member", involved in album cover conception and graphic design, bringing in Jean-Baptiste Mondino, Lynn Goldsmith and Franky Boy. He also managed tour production. He signed Téléphone at Pathé Marconi. He met Philippe Constantin, whose musical knowledge pleased him and who became his closest friend.

Shortly after signing the contract, in November 1977, Téléphone released its first album. It went gold in a few months. The band sold millions of albums over the years.

In 1980 Ravard established the "Telephone Music" a publishing company. He was one of the first to invest money in video promos (with such director as Julien Temple who made Argent trop cher and ça or Jean-Baptiste Mondino Un autre monde). Ravard signed the band to a deal with Virgin UK and hired a British booking agent to get dates outside France.

François Ravard handled A&R for toward Anglo-Saxon producers including Mike Thorne, Martin Rushent, Bob Ezrin and Glynn Johns.

In 1985, due to internal tension, the band split up.

== Marianne Faithfull ==
François Ravard joined Artmedia from 1986 to 1987, taking care of artists Jean-Louis Aubert and Rita Mitsouko - (for The No Comprendo) and signed Laurent Boutonnat or Marie Trintignant.

In 1987, François Ravard established movie production company R. Films. He produced short films and three feature films: Divine enfant by Jean-Pierre Mocky (1988), Stan the Flasher by Serge Gainsbourg (1990), La Pagaille, de Pascal Thomas (1991).

In 1994, while sharing office with Philippe Constantin, the latter introduced him to Marianne Faithfull. Ravard became her impresario, manager and A&R person. He encouraged her work in theater, cinema, recordings, tours and readings.

Faithfull got the leading role in Black Rider. François Ravard then worked with her on the 20th Century Blues album, followed by a worldwide tour: An Evening in the Weimar Republic. Faithfull then recorded Seven Deadly Sins. The show appeared in opera theaters all over the world.

For the Vagabond Ways album, Ravard suggested the Roger Waters song Flower Child and Elton John For Wanting You. For the album Kissin Time, he brought in collaborators Blur, Billy Corgan, Beck, Dave Stewart and Jarvis Cocker. On Before the Poison he arranged contributions from PJ Harvey and Nick Cave.

Ravard co-produced the Dream'in My Dream documentary, as well as Live In Hollywood. He encouraged Faithfull to work with Patrice Chéreau (Intimacy) and Sofia Coppola (Marie-Antoinette).

== Discography ==
=== Albums with Téléphone ===
- Téléphone (1977)
- Crache ton venin (1979)
- Au cœur de la nuit (1980)
- Dure limite (1982)
- Un autre monde (1984)

=== Albums with Marianne Faithfull ===
- 20th Century Blues (1997)
- Weill: The Seven Deadly Sins (1998)
- Vagabond Ways (1999)
- Kissin Time (2002)
- Before the Poison (2004)
- Live in Hollywood
- Live at the BBC (2008)
- Easy Come, Easy Go (2008)
- Horses and High Heels (2011)

=== Music DVD with Marianne Faithfull ===
- Sings Kurt Weill - Montréal Jazz Festival (1997)
- Dreaming my dreams (1999)
- Live from The Henry Fonda Theater in Hollywood (+ 1 CD) (2005)

== Sources ==
- François Ravard at IMDb
- «The Secret World of Serge Gainsbourg», Vanity Fair, November 2007.
