= Earwig (film) =

2021 film

- Directed by: Lucile Hadžihalilović
- Written by: Lucile Hadžihalilović; Geoff Cox
- Based on: Earwig by Brian Catling
- Produced by: Jean des Forêts; Amélie Jacquis; Andrew Starke
- Starring: Alex Lawther; Paul Hilton; Romaine Hemelaers
- Cinematography: Jonathan Ricquebourg
- Edited by: Adam Finch
- Music by: Augustin Viard; Warren Ellis; Nicolas Becker
- Production companies: Petit Film; BFI Film Fund; Anti-Worlds; Frakas Productions; Film4
- Distributed by: New Story (France); Anti-Worlds (United Kingdom)
- Release date: 10 September 2021 (TIFF)
- Running time: 114 minutes
- Countries: United Kingdom; Belgium; France
- Language: English

Earwig is a 2021 neo-noir body horror drama film co-written and directed by Lucile Hadžihalilović, based on the eponymous novel by Brian Catling. It is a co-production of the United Kingdom, Belgium, and France.

The film premiered in the Platform Prize program at the 2021 Toronto International Film Festival.

== Premise ==
In bleak post-war Europe, a hot-tempered middle-aged man named Albert Scellinc must care for a strange little girl named Mia, who has no teeth. Every day Albert fashions new dentures for her out of ice, collecting the meltwater saliva in an odd device and refreezing it. Albert dreams of a dreamy past with his wife at a country manor, and when a mysterious voice instructs him to prepare Mia for the outside world, he is brought into contact with barmaid Celeste and her sinister friend Laurence, with violent consequences.

== Cast ==
- Paul Hilton as Albert Scellinc
- Romane Hemelaers as Mia
- Romola Garai as Céleste
- Alex Lawther as Laurence
- Peter Van Den Begin as The stranger
- Anastasia Robin as Marie Scellinc
- Michael Pas as The doctor
- Isabelle de Hertogh as The concierge
- Marie Bos as The receptionist

== Music ==
- Augustin Viard - Composer "Earwig's Theme" and Ondes Martenot
- Warren Ellis - Music producer
- Nicolas Becker - cristal Baschet

== Release ==
Earwig screened at the BFI London Film Festival and was released in cinemas in the United Kingdom on 10 June 2022.
