= Negative Capability (album) =

Studio album by Marianne Faithfull
- Released: 2 November 2018
- Recorded: January 2018
- Studios: La Frette Studios, Paris
- Genres: Rock; folk
- Length: 42:30
- Label: Panta Rei
- Producers: Head; Rob Ellis; Warren Ellis

Marianne Faithfull chronology
No Exit (2016)	Negative Capability (2018)	She Walks in Beauty (2022)

Singles from Negative Capability
- 1. "The Gypsy Faerie Queen" Released: 14 September 2018

Negative Capability is the twentieth studio album by British singer Marianne Faithfull. It was released on 2 November 2018, and produced by Rob Ellis, Warren Ellis and Head. Described as her "most honest album", songs on Negative Capability deal with themes of love, death, as well as terrorism and loneliness. She revisits three old recordings: "It's All Over Now, Baby Blue" from Rich Kid Blues, recorded in 1971 under the title Masques, which is her 'lost' album and was not released until 1985; "Witches Song", from 1979's comeback album Broken English; and "As Tears Go By", which started her career as a 17-year-old. Faithfull recorded it for the second time aged 40 on 1987's Strange Weather. The rest of the songs are, with one exception, all new and co-written by Faithfull with help from some of her long time collaborators like Nick Cave and Ed Harcourt. The "Loneliest Person" is a cover of a Pretty Things composition from their 1968 album S.F. Sorrow.

The lead single, "The Gypsy Faerie Queen", was released on 14 September 2018.

== Background and development ==
The album was first announced in December 2017 in Faithfull's interview with Uncut. The album's title is a reference to the famous phrase "negative capability" used by Romantic poet John Keats in 1817 in a letter to his brothers.

== Music and lyrics ==
Described by Faithfull as "the most honest record she's ever made", Negative Capability has a "folky" feel. "They Come at Night" was written with Mark Lanegan following the November 2015 Paris attacks. Faithfull said she got the idea from producer Hal Willner, and his theory that every seventy years the Nazis return in some form or another. She debuted the song during her concert at the Bataclan theatre in November 2016, a year after the terrorist attack took its place there.

== Artwork and packaging ==
Shot by Yann Orhan, the cover art for the album was released on 5 September 2018.

== Singles ==
On 13 September 2018, "The Gypsy Faerie Queen" was serviced to several radio stations in Europe as the album's lead single. It was released to online music stores on 14 September 2018 along with the album becoming available for pre-order.

== Critical reception ==
Professional ratings
Aggregate scores
Source	Rating
AnyDecentMusic?	8.3/10
Metacritic	88/100
Review scores
Source	Rating
The 405	(8.5/10)
AllMusic	3.5/5 stars
Clash	(9/10)
Crack Magazine	(8/10)
The Guardian	5/5 stars
MusicOMH	5/5 stars
NME	4/5 stars
Pitchfork	(8/10)
Rolling Stone	3.5/5 stars
Vice (Expert Witness)	(3-star Honorable Mention)

Negative Capability was met with "universal acclaim" reviews from critics. At Metacritic, which assigns a weighted average rating out of 100 to reviews from mainstream publications, this release received an average score of 88 based on 14 reviews.

The Guardian gave the album a five star review, calling it "a masterly meditation on ageing and death." Comparing the record with the late work of Johnny Cash and Leonard Cohen, the review noted that "Negative Capability really does belong in such exalted company."

Writing for AllMusic, Mark Deming explained: "The performance on Negative Capability comes from a vocalist who has learned a lot more about love, heartache, and the good and bad places that fate can take you than the 18-year-old ever imagined she could know. It's more than a little rueful, but also full of hard-won wisdom, and the rough edges of her voice only add to the resonance of the performance." Cameron Cook of Crack wrote: "On her 21st solo album Negative Capability, her husky voice grazes atop a pruned collection of 10 songs, some new, some revisited, but all bearing her trademark haunting aura." Mark Beaumont of NME said: "Marianne husks in a last love letter to old friends and lovers. It doesn’t define ‘Negative Capability’, however; the record might read like a last testament, but it bristles with warmth and life, a 40-minute reason to stay positive."

== Track listing ==
Negative Capability
No.	Title	Writer(s)	Length
1.	"Misunderstanding"	Marianne Faithfull; Rob McVey; Sivert Høyem; Ed Harcourt	4:04
2.	"The Gypsy Faerie Queen"	Marianne Faithfull; Nick Cave	3:40
3.	"As Tears Go By"	Mick Jagger; Keith Richards; Andrew Loog Oldham	3:52
4.	"In My Own Particular Way"	Marianne Faithfull; Ed Harcourt; Warren Ellis; Rob McVey	4:21
5.	"Born to Live"	Marianne Faithfull; Ed Harcourt	3:39
6.	"Witches Song" (Re-recorded)	Marianne Faithfull; Barry Reynolds; Joe Mavety; Steve York; Terry Stannard	4:57
7.	"It's All Over Now, Baby Blue" (Re-recorded)	Bob Dylan	5:01
8.	"They Come at Night"	Marianne Faithfull; Mark Lanegan	3:40
9.	"Don't Go"	Marianne Faithfull; Ed Harcourt	4:20
10.	"No Moon in Paris"	Marianne Faithfull; Ed Harcourt	4:56

Negative Capability — deluxe version (bonus tracks)
No.	Title	Writer(s)	Length
11.	"Loneliest Person"	Phil May; Dick Taylor; Wally Waller; Skip Alan; John Povey; John Alder	2:52
12.	"No Moon in Paris" (radio edit)	Marianne Faithfull; Ed Harcourt	3:26
13.	"They Come at Night" (alternative version)	Marianne Faithfull; Mark Lanegan	3:36

== Personnel ==
- Marianne Faithfull – vocals
- Nick Cave – backing vocals (1), additional vocals (2), piano (2)
- Rob McVey – guitar (1–4, 7–13), piano (7), synthesiser (7), backing vocals (2)
- Ed Harcourt – piano (1, 3, 5–6, 9–12), bass guitar (2, 10–12), baritone guitar (3, 8, 13), keyboards (4), wurlitzer (5, 6), rhodes (7), organ (7), harmonium (10, 12), backing vocals (2, 4, 9, 10, 12)
- Warren Ellis – viola (1, 2, 10, 12), synthesiser (1, 7–9, 13), violin (3, 7, 11), keyboards (4, 11), piano (4, 7), synthesiser bass (4), alto flute (5, 6, 9), backing vocals (1, 2, 4), producer
- Rob Ellis – drums (2, 4, 8, 11, 13), percussion (2–4, 7–9, 11, 13), synthesiser (4, 8, 13), piano (4, 7), bass synthesiser (5, 6), glockenspiel (10, 12), thumbjam synthesiser (13), backing vocals (1, 2, 4), producer
- Head – producer

== Charts ==
=== Weekly charts ===
Chart (2018)	Peak position
Austrian Albums (Ö3 Austria)	20
Belgian Albums (Ultratop Flanders)	12
Belgian Albums (Ultratop Wallonia)	43
Dutch Albums (Album Top 100)	34
French Albums (SNEP)	59
German Albums (Offizielle Top 100)	27
Irish Albums (IRMA)	99
Irish Independent Albums (IRMA)	8
Norwegian Albums (VG-lista)	32
Scottish Albums (Official Charts)	23
Spanish Albums (PROMUSICAE)	85
Swiss Albums (Schweizer Hitparade)	14
UK Albums (Official Charts)	44
US Independent Albums (Billboard)	38
UK Independent Albums (Official Charts)	4

=== Year-end charts ===
Chart (2018)	Position
Belgian Albums (Ultratop Flanders)	143
