= Cold Brains =

Single by Beck

from the album Mutations
- Released: March 1, 1999
- Length: 3:41
- Label: MCA Import
- Songwriter: Beck Hansen

Beck singles chronology
"Tropicalia" (1998)	"Cold Brains" (1999)	"Nobody's Fault but My Own" (1999)

"Cold Brains" is a song by Beck. It appears on his 1998 album Mutations. The song was also released as a single. It was also released in Australia as an exclusive tour EP. Three of the B-sides, "One of These Days", "Diamond in the Sleaze" and "Electric Music and the Summer People", had previously been Japanese exclusives, and as such this EP became a very popular import, especially as those tracks had still not been released officially in the UK, Europe or US as of 2014.

The single was intended to be released in the US with a different track listing, but only a promotional version was produced.

Beck intended the song to be released on his independent 1994 album One Foot in the Grave, but for unknown reasons, it was instead released on Mutations.

When asked about "Cold Brains"' bleakness, Beck said:

I think of it as mostly playful, but then I think Leonard Cohen is a humorous song writer. In 'Cold Brains' when I say, 'The fields of green are obscene and I lay upon the gravel', there's just this demented auto-erotica that I think is hilarious. It's not meant to necessarily bring anybody down or bum anybody out.

As of 2019, Beck has performed the song live in concert 139 times. He has, however, not performed it live since May 2013.

== Track listings ==
1. "Cold Brains" – 3:34
2. "One of These Days" – 4:48
3. "Diamond in the Sleaze" – 4:08
4. "Halo of Gold" – 4:29
5. "Electric Music and the Summer People" (alternate version) – 3:35

=== Alternate promotional CD ===
1. "Cold Brains" – 3:44
2. "Electric Music and the Summer People" (alternate version) – 3:37
3. "Halo of Gold" – 4:31
4. "Runners Dial Zero" – 4:06
5. "Diamond Bollocks" – 6:01

== Personnel ==
- Beck – vocals, guitars, piano, harmonica, glockenspiel
- Justin Meldal-Johnsen – bass
- Roger Joseph Manning, Jr. – synthesizer
- Joey Waronker – drums and percussion
