= Paul Trueblood =

Paul Trueblood (November 11, 1935 - January 16, 2012) was musical director/pianist for a variety of performers including Diane Keaton, Michael Feinstein, Julie Wilson, Carol Lawrence, Matthew Broderick, Anita Ellis, and Earl Wrightson and Lois Hunt. He was personal pianist for lyricist Alan Jay Lerner and director Joshua Logan. He wrote special material for Radio City Music Hall, Martin Charnin's Upstairs at O'Neal's, numerous cabaret performers, and two scores for the American Methodist Bicentennial A Church Is Born (Carnegie Hall, 1985) and Aldersgate 88 (Avery Fisher Hall, 1988). He appeared with Betty Comden and Adolph Green on Broadway and thereafter in many concert engagements.

He conducted the New York companies of the Drama Critics Award musical Your Own Thing, the 1986 Broadway revival of Oh, Coward!, Joshua Logan's remounting of Annie Get Your Gun, The Chosen, Red White and Maddox and Dancing in the Dark, a revue of the songs of Dietz and Schwartz, produced by Arthur Schwartz for the Manhattan Theater Club.

In 1996-97, he toured the world with Marianne Faithfull in a Kurt Weill evening. His CD with Marianne Faithfull, 20th Century Blues, was recorded live at the New Morning Club and released by RCA Victor.

As a composer, Paul Trueblood's work was heard at Radio City Music Hall, Carnegie Hall, Lincoln Center and in every major New York cabaret venue.

He conducted two CDs with Metropolitan Opera star Youngok Shin (Samsung Classics), and with Broadway legend Sally Ann Howes, and was the musical director for young German chanteuse Micaela Leon.

He was also a Master Teacher at the annual Cabaret Conference at Yale University.
