= Syd Arthur =

English rock band

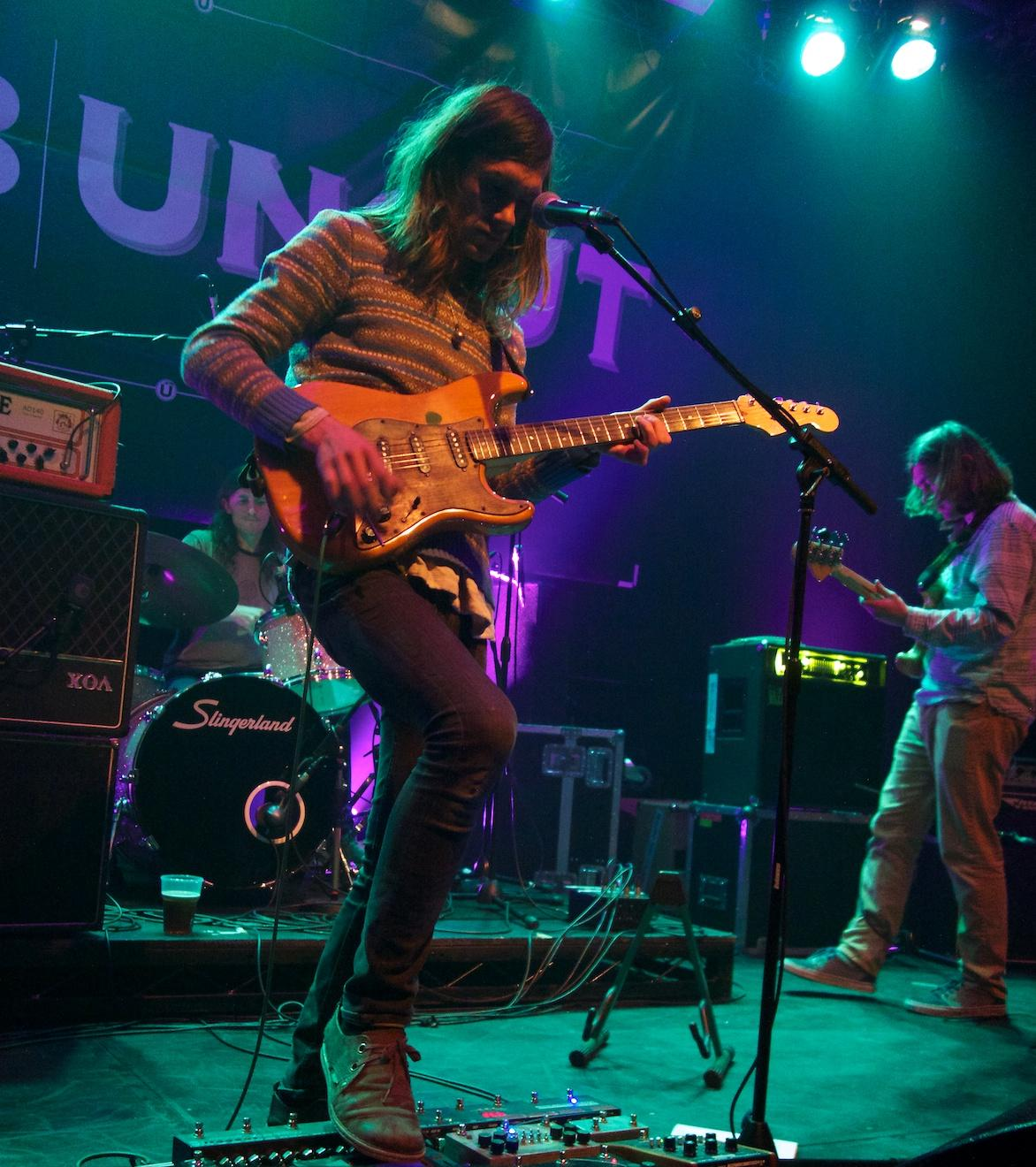
- Syd Arthur performing at The Great Escape Festival

Background information
- Origin: Canterbury, Kent, England
- Genres: Canterbury Scene, alternative rock, progressive rock, psychedelic rock, English folk
- Years active: 2003–2017
- Labels: Harvest Records; Dawn Chorus Recording Company; Green Bean Records; Madman Records
- Past members: Liam Magill; Joel Magill; Josh Magill; Raven Bush; Fred Rother
- Website: www.sydarthur.co.uk

Syd Arthur were an English psychedelic rock band, formed in Canterbury in 2003 by brothers frontman Liam and bassist Joel Magill, drummer Fred Rother and violinist Raven Bush. Rother was replaced by the Magills' younger brother Josh in 2016.

== History ==
Formed in 2003, the band were initially known as Grumpy Jumper and then Moshka before settling on the name Syd Arthur. The band's name is taken from the 1922 Hermann Hesse novel Siddhartha, with the spelling changed reportedly as a nod to the influences of Syd Barrett and Arthur Lee. The Magill brothers had played together since childhood, added drummer Fred Rother in high school and classmate Raven Bush became the final member at 17. Bush is the son of John Carder Bush, brother of Kate Bush.

The band released their self-titled debut album in 2006 on Madman Records and the Kingdoms Of Experience EP in 2008. The band then set up their own recording space, Wicker Studios, and their own label, Dawn Chorus Recording Company. In 2011 they self-released the Moving World EP and "Ode to the Summer" single, before releasing their second album, On an On, in July 2012. The band's bassist, Joel Magill, stated that the band released the album themselves "because it’s the only way we know. It may have been harder and longer for us but it has given us more satisfaction, I think. But if a major label waved a lot of money at us and said you could work with anyone you wanted we would have to think about that". The band undertook their first nationwide tour to promote the album in February 2013. The band supported Paul Weller on tour in October 2013, and he invited the band to record in his studio and tipped the band for success in 2014 in the NME.

In December 2013, the band signed to the newly re-activated Harvest Records label. Originally a subsidiary of EMI and linked to the progressive rock movement of the early 1970s in England, the label is now owned by Universal Music Group. The band's debut album was released in the US for the first time on the label.

The band released their third album, Sound Mirror, in June 2014. The band spent much of the year in the US, performing at South by Southwest and Coachella and supporting the likes of Sean Lennon's band The Ghost of a Saber Tooth Tiger and Yes. The band promoted the album at home with nationwide tour in September–October 2014, after having postponed dates from earlier in the year. The band are currently playing with the Magills' brother Josh filling in for Fred Rother, who has missed gigs in the past due to problems with tinnitus.

On 10 June 2016, the band announced that their fourth studio album, Apricity, would be released on 21 October 2016 and also released the title track as the lead single. This is the first album to feature Josh Magill on drums, and confirms the departure of Fred Rother. It was later confirmed that Rother left the band prior to recording the album due to "severe hearing difficulties", with singer Liam Magill adding that "it was a precarious moment, Fred leaving, but Josh sort of saved the day, in a way. The transition was slightly difficult because we’ve been a tight band, you know, us four members, for a long time. That was a big change".

On 8 March 2019, an archive recording from 2012 of Canterbury jazz group Jack Hues and the Quartet (whose namesake is of Wang Chung fame) featuring members of Syd Arthur as part of his backing band was released. The recording was of a cover version of the Beck song "Nobody's Fault but My Own".

== Band members ==
=== Past members ===
- Liam Magill – lead vocals, lead guitar
- Joel Magill – bass guitar, backing vocals
- Josh Magill – drums
- Raven Bush – violin, keyboard, mandolin
- Fred Rother – drums

== Discography ==
=== Albums ===
- Syd Arthur (2006), Madman Records
- On an On (July 2012), Dawn Chorus Recording Company
- Sound Mirror (June 2014), Harvest Records
- Apricity (October 2016), Harvest Records

=== EPs ===
- Kingdoms of Experience (2008), Green Bean Records
- Moving World (March 2011), Dawn Chorus Recording Company
- Nobody's Fault but My Own (with Jack Hues and the Quartet) (March 2019)

=== Singles ===
- "Ode to the Summer" (October 2011), Dawn Chorus Recording Company
- "Dorothy" (November 2012), Dawn Chorus Recording Company

== Filmography ==
- 2015: Romantic Warriors III: Canterbury Tales (DVD)
- 2017: Need For Speed: Payback (PS4, Xbox, PC)
