= Tropicalia (song) =

Single by Beck

from the album Mutations
- B-side: "Halo of Gold" / "Black Balloon"
- Released: December 7, 1998
- Genre: Tropicália
- Length: 3:23
- Label: Geffen
- Songwriter: Beck Hansen
- Producers: Nigel Godrich; Beck Hansen

Beck singles chronology
"Deadweight" (1997)	"Tropicalia" (1998)	"Cold Brains" (1999)

"Tropicalia" is a song by Beck from his 1998 album Mutations. It was released as a single in the UK in December 1998. The B-side "Halo of Gold" is a drastically reworked cover version of "Furry Heroine (Halo of Gold)" by Skip Spence.

== Background ==
Beck said that "Tropicalia"'s inspiration was "I've always loved a lot of different exotic music. I've been listening to Brazilian music since I was a kid, but I haven't really felt it was something that would come naturally until the last few years. I think for something like 'Tropicalia' I needed to go to places where that music existed in order to get to the point where I could do it myself. I wrote it in the back of the bus on tour, and then later I put lyrics to it. A lot of times I write the melody and the chords of the songs sometimes years before I ever get around it writing lyrics, so it just sits there incubating."

Beck does not play any instrument in the song.

== Track listings ==
=== CD ===
1. "Tropicalia" – 3:23
2. "Halo of Gold" – 4:29
3. "Black Balloon" – 3:30

=== 7" ===
1. "Tropicalia" – 3:23
2. "Halo of Gold" – 4:29

== Personnel ==
- Beck Hansen – vocals
- Roger Joseph Manning Jr. – synthesizer, organ, percussion
- Justin Meldal-Johnsen – acoustic bass, percussion
- Joey Waronker – drums, percussion, drum machine
- Smokey Hormel – percussion, cuíca, acoustic guitar
- David Ralicke – flute, trombone
