= Nobody's Fault but My Own =

Single by Beck

from the album Mutations
- Released: April 21, 1999
- Recorded: 1998
- Genre: Psychedelic folk, raga rock
- Length: 4:45 (edit); 5:02 (album version)
- Label: Geffen
- Songwriter: Beck Hansen
- Producer: Nigel Godrich

Beck singles chronology
"Cold Brains" (1999)	"Nobody's Fault but My Own" (1999)	"Sexx Laws" (1999)

"Nobody's Fault but My Own" is a song by American musician Beck. The song was released in 1998 on his album Mutations, and was released as a single in Japan only on April 21, 1999. The CD single came backed with the exclusive tracks "One of These Days" and "Diamond in the Sleaze" as B-sides. The insert features the lyrics in both English and Japanese.

== Background ==
When asked about the story behind "Nobody's Fault but My Own", Beck said, "Well I went down to my basement. It was raining outside, and I wrote it."

== Live performances ==
On October 12, 2019, Beck performed the song live in concert for the first time since 2005. The performance took place at the Hammer Museum, and featured Chris Martin.

== Reception ==
Danny Wright of The Guardian ranked "Nobody's Fault but My Own" the 5th best Beck song, and wrote that it "is the song you play as you sit in the dark of your room, rueing the day past. Even the title is dripping in introspection." He further wrote that "it's heaviness is leavened by the deftness of the orchestration, Nigel Godrichs' production and the beautifully wistful soundscape."

James Jackson Toth of Stereogum ranked "Nobody's Fault but My Own" the 6th best Beck song, and wrote that it was his "most meritous stab at psychedelia" and also praised Godrichs' production. Toth compared it to Beck's earlier songs "Whiskeyclone, Hotel City 1997" and "Steal My Body Home".

== Covers ==
The song was covered by Marianne Faithfull on her 2002 album Kissin Time, under Beck's production.

The song was covered by Rising Appalachia on their 2006 album Leah and Chloe.

In 2019, the English psychedelic rock band Syd Arthur released a cover of the song on their EP (with the same name as the Beck song), recorded in a barn in 2012. The cover features the Canterbury jazz group Jack Hues and the Quartet.

== Personnel ==
- Beck - Vocals, guitar, piano
- Justin Meldal-Johnsen - Bass guitar
- Joey Waronker - Percussion
- David Campbell - Viola, Conductor, String Arrangements
- Larry Corbett - Cello
- Warren Klein - Sitar, Tambura
- Fred Sesliano - Esraj

== In popular culture ==
The song was used in the 14th episode of the 4th season of the American comedy-drama series Ugly Betty, "Smokin' Hot". It starts playing when Claire Meade (Judith Light) spots her son Tyler coming out on a runway. It was also used in the American science fiction neo-Western series Outer Range during the outro and end credits of the second season, episode 5 titled "All the World's a Stage".

== Track listing ==
1. "Nobody's Fault but My Own" (Edit) – 4:45
2. "One of These Days" – 4:48
3. "Diamond in the Sleaze" – 4:07
