= Augustin Viard =

French musician

Augustin Viard (born 1984) is a French musician who plays the ondes Martenot, an electronic instrument developed in the 1920s.

His work includes performances with international symphonic orchestras, chamber music ensembles and solo concerts. His contributions as a player and composer are regularly aired on Radio France programmes, and his recordings include collaborations with Nick Cave and the Bad Seeds, Rob Simonsen, Evgueni Galperine and the soundtrack of several award-nominated movies such as Loveless, Earwig, Blonde or Black Flies.

Augustin Viard is listed as one of the rare contemporary ondists and owns a collection of authentic instruments made by Maurice Martenot.

== Biography ==
Augustin Viard was born in Provence in 1984. He studied the ondes Martenot at the Conservatoire de Boulogne-Billancourt and at the Conservatoire National Supérieur de Musique de Paris from which he graduated with a master's degree in 2013.

=== Stage career ===
He launched his career as a soloist and chamber musician with Ensemble Vecteur Ondes and Ensemble Volta.

He played the ondes Martenot part of Ecuatorial by Edgard Varèse in Paris with the Ensemble Intercontemporain in 2012, under Susanna Mälkki. In 2015 he performed Jeanne d’Arc au bûcher by Arthur Honegger in Utrecht (Netherlands) with Het Promenade Orkest under Jos Vermunt. He has also given performances of this piece in Osnabrück (Germany) in 2017 with the Osnabrücker Symphonieorchester under Andreas Hotz, in Mexico City in 2018 with the Orquesta Filarmónica de la UNAM under Sylvain Gasançon, and in Katowice (Poland) in 2019 with the Polish National Radio Symphony Orchestra conducted by Alexander Liebreich. The same year, he performed the piece again with Marion Cotillard in the lead role, with the Orchestre National de Lille, conducted by Alexander Bloch, at the George Enescu Festival in Bucharest (Romania).

Viard also performs the major and demanding works of Olivier Messiaen, such as the Turangalîla-Symphonie, performed in 2023 in the United States, the opera Saint François d'Assise under the direction of Kent Nagano in 2024 and with the Vienna Philharmonic conducted by Maxime Pascal in 2026, as well as Trois Petites Liturgies de la Présence Divine, led by Ingo Metzmacher the same year.

=== Film and audio recordings ===
In 2014, he released his debut album Les nuages de Magellan in collaboration with Ensemble Volta. This included all the chamber music pieces for ondes Martenot composed by Tristan Murail. This recording won the Grand Prix du Président de la République de l'Académie Charles Cros 2014, an honour awarded by the French president François Hollande.

Since 2016, French public radio station France Culture regularly commissions Viard to compose and perform original pieces for broadcast.

In 2017 he played Ondes Martenot on the award-winning soundtrack of the international film Loveless. This film received the Prix du Jury du Festival de Cannes 2017 and the César du meilleur film étranger (best foreign film) 2018. The composers Evgueni and Sacha Galperine won the Best Composer European Film Awards 2017.

In 2018, he composed the original music for the audio cinema film Le brasier Shelley with Warren Ellis, starring Gaspard Ulliel, Warren Ellis and Marianne Faithfull. This film was selected for the Festival du Nouveau Cinéma of Montréal competition 2018.

In 2019, he performed all the Ondes Martenot parts on Nick Cave's album Ghosteen. The album achieved number 4 in the main UK charts and reached top 10 positions in 15 European countries.

In 2020, Augustin Viard's ondes Martenot feature on Marianne Faithfull's The Lady of Shallot, in another collaboration with Nick Cave (Piano) and Warren Ellis (synthesiser and loops). The 11 minute long track is part of Faithfull's album She Walks in Beauty, which reached the Billboard 200 when released a few months later, peaking at number 51.

In 2021, Viard composed the original theme for Earwig, a full-length movie directed by Lucile Hadzihalilovic, which won the Special Jury Prize at the San Sebastian international film festival. Viard's score attracted rave international reviews, The Hollywood Reporter noting "a gorgeous minimalistic score", The Irish Times "Augustin Viard’s music (...) spreads brilliantly eerie glitch about the queasy action" and the Daily Telegraph calling the film "blessed by a gorgeous, otherworldly score by Augustin Viard, a specialist in the ondes Martenot."

In 2022, he appears as an ondes Martenot performer on the soundtrack of the highly successful Netflix film Blonde, a fiction based around the life of Marilyn Monroe.

In 2023, academy award winner Nicolas Becker asks Viard to perform ondes Martenot on the soundtrack of the American thriller Black Flies starring Sean Penn. The movie is officially selected for the 2023 Cannes Film Festival.

== Notable performances ==
Year		Piece	Orchestra	Conductor	Country
1	2012	« Ecuatorial » by Edgard Varèse	Ensemble Intercontemporain	Susanna Mälkki	France
2	2015	« Jeanne d’Arc au bûcher » by Arthur Honegger	Het Promenade Orkest	Jos Vermunt	Netherlands
3	2017	« Jeanne d’Arc au bûcher » by Arthur Honegger	Osnabrücker Symphonieorchester	Andreas Hotz	Germany
4	2018	« Jeanne d’Arc au bûcher » by Arthur Honegger	La Orquesta Fiarmónica de la UNAM	Sylvain Gasançon	Mexico
5	2019	« Jeanne d’Arc au bûcher » by Arthur Honegger	Polish National Radio Symphony Orchestra	Alexander Liebreich	Poland
6	2019	« Jeanne d’Arc au bûcher » by Arthur Honegger Title role : Marion Cotillard	Orchestre National de Lille	Alexandre Bloch	Romania
7	2023	"Turangalila Symphonie" by Olivier Messiaen	Utah Symphony Orchestra	Thierry Fischer	USA
8	2023	"Saint François d'Assise" by Olivier Messiaen	Le Balcon	Maxime Pascal	Roumanie
9	2024	"Saint François d'Assise" by Olivier Messiaen	Philharmonic State Orchestra Hamburg	Kent Nagano	Allemagne
10	2026	"Trois Petites Liturgies de la Présence Divine" by Olivier Messiaen	Warsaw Philharmonic orchestra	Ingo Metzmacher	Pologne
11	2026	"Saint François d'Assise" by Olivier Messiaen	Vienna Philharmonic Orchestra	Maxime Pascal	Autriche

== Main recordings ==
2014

CD release, Ensemble Volta « Les nuages de Magellan », Tristan Murail chamber music pieces for ondes Martenot, Recommended Records

2016

Broadcast, « Les mains d’Orlac » by Céline Ters and Ludovic Chavarot, France Culture, Radio France

2017

Audio film, « Vent Clair » by Corentin Pichon and Céline Ters, France Culture, Radio France

CD release, « Loveless » Original Motion Picture Soundtrack, Music by Evgueni and Sacha Galperine, Varèse Sarabande

2018

CD release, « Aïtone », French rock band album, Modulor

Audio film, « Le brasier Shelley » by Céline Ters and Ludovic Chavarot, France Culture, Radio France

Audio film, « Dans la tête d'Ingmar Bergman » by Florence Colombani and Céline Ters, France Culture, Radio France

Film, « Cuba, un aller et un retour » by Frédéric Compain, Arte TV

2019

CD release, "Rêveries" by Rob Simonsen, Sony Masterworks.

CD and Vinyl release, "Ghosteen" by Nick Cave and the Bad Seeds, Bad Seed Ltd.

2020

CD and Vinyl release, "She Walks in Beauty" by Marianne Faithfull (with Warren Ellis), BMG.

2021

Movie soundtrack, Earwig, directed by Lucile Hadzihalilovic, Wild Bunch international

Audio film, "La Japonaise", by Céline Ters and Patrick Boudet, France Culture, Radio France.

2022

CD and Vinyl release, Blonde, film soundtrack Lakeshore Records and Invada Records

2023

Movie soundtrack (performer), Black Flies, directed by Jean-Stéphane Sauvaire, music by Nicolas Becker & Quentin Sirjac, Open Road Films

== Extra links ==
- Augustin Viard - Ondes Martenot
- Augustin Viard (ondes Martenot)
