= She Walks in Beauty (album) =

Studio album by Warren Ellis and Marianne Faithfull
- Released: April 30, 2021
- Recorded: 2020
- Studio: Poptones, Paris, Île-de-France, France (cello on "The Bridge of Sighs", "Ode to a Nightingale", "The Prelude: Book One Introduction", "So We'll Go No More a Roving"); The Retreat, Brighton, Brighton and Hove, England, United Kingdom (piano on "She Walks in Beauty", "The Bridge of Sighs", "La Belle Dame sans Merci", "Ode to a Nightingale", "To Autumn", "Ozymandias", "Surprised by Joy", "To the Moon", "The Lady of Shalott")
- Genre: Experimental rock; musique concrète; spoken word
- Length: 46:25
- Language: English
- Label: BMG/Panta Rei
- Producer: Warren Ellis

Warren Ellis chronology
Carnage (2021)	She Walks in Beauty (2021)	La Panthère Des Neiges (2021)

Marianne Faithfull chronology
Negative Capability (2018)	She Walks in Beauty (2021)

“I had a wonderful, inspirational English teacher called Mrs Simpson. She introduced me to the English Romantics. I had to leave it all behind in order to be a pop singer, but I never forgot them.”

—Faithfull on her inspiration for the recordings

She Walks in Beauty is a 2021 studio album by Australian multi-instrumentalist Warren Ellis, and the twenty-first and final studio album by British singer Marianne Faithfull. Putting music to British romantic poetry, Faithfull started recording it in 2020, only finishing it during her recovery from a serious case of COVID-19. She has described the work as her dream project that she wanted to record for 50 years. The album received positive reviews from critics.

== Reception ==
Editors at AnyDecentMusic? aggregated the scores from 16 critics and scored this album a 7.6 out of 10. According to the review aggregator Metacritic, She Walks in Beauty received "universal acclaim" based on a weighted average score of 81 out of 100 from 14 critic scores.

Editors at AllMusic rated this album 4 out of 5 stars, with critic Mark Deming writing that the age in her voice "has made her art stronger and more eloquent" and that this album is "a loving testimony to the power and lasting vigor of the Romantic poets, and also a reminder of how lucky we are to have an artist as gifted as Marianne Faithfull giving us this remarkable tutorial". American Songwriter's Lee Zimmerman rated this album 3 out of 5 stars, calling it "a remarkable recording" for the circumstances under which it was recorded and praising Ellis' arrangements and instrumentation. Guy Oddy of The Arts Desk scored this album 3 out of 5 stars and characterized it as "more likely to soundtrack occasional moments in time rather than to become a turntable regular". Nick Roseblade rated this release a 9 out of 10 for Clash Music, stating that Faithfull's vocals are key and continuing that "her delivery is precise yet warming" and that "Ellis has created understated gossamer soundscapes that emphasise the emotions of the poems but don't draw the attention from Faithfull's voice".

A five-star review from Helen Brown in The Independent called this work "an unsentimental spine-tingler of an album from a pirate crew of against-the-odds survivors" and that Ellis "whittled such elegant woody melodies around her words that it sounded like he'd carved her a Viking funeral barge". In The Irish Times, Siobahn Kane scored this album 4 out of 5 stars, stating that "Ellis's version of musique concrète (featuring Nick Cave on piano and Brian Eno contributing some sound textures) [adds] something quite special" to Faithfull's voice. Victoria Segal gave She Walks in Beauty 4 out of 5 stars in Mojo, calling the release "an emotional collection" that is enhanced by being released deep into Faithfull's career, as "the burnished patina of her voice carries all the experience needed for" these recitations. At musicOMH, Matt Cotsell rated this album 4.5 out of 5 stars, stating that "the poems selected are a treat for fans with extensive knowledge of the Romantics and equally for those with none" and that "a large part of that gratification comes from Ellis's charismatic score". In The Observer, Phil Mongredien rated this release 4 out of 5 stars, calling it "a magical return" for Faithfull and he expresses thankfulness that Faithfull was able to survive a difficult case of COVID-19.

Writing for Pitchfork, Daniel Felsenthal rated this album a 6.7 out of 10, calling it "a passion project of the highest order" that "doesn't do a whole lot to transcend" its basic concept of poetry reading and he compares Ellis' instrumentation to Ghosteen. Peter Piatkowski wrote that this work displays the "particular genius" of Faithfull to "capture the sad, reflective mood of the world" and he gave it an 8 out of 10. She Walks in Beauty got 4 out of 5 stars in Record Collector, where critic Terry Staunton wrote that "Faithfull's delivery takes the listener on an adventure further into mores and morals of another time". Kory Grow of Rolling Stone rated this 3.5 out of 4 stars, stating that "her warm, lived-in voice finds new depths in [these] verses" and summing up that "the reason it's so effective its because it's the full package: Faithfull's devastating voice, the poets’ brilliant verses, and delicate ambient music, performed by her collaborators—Ellis, Nick Cave, and Brian Eno, among others". The Sydney Morning Herald's Bruce Elder gave this release 4 out of 5 stars, for being "a towering benchmark" that "works brilliantly" as "a haunting collection of indescribably beautiful poetry read in Faithfull's husky, melancholy and deeply emotional voice, and backed, for the most part, by discreet washes and waves of sonic sepia, played mostly on violin". A 7 out of 10 came from Rob Hughes in Uncut who casts this music as "imbued with rich personal experience, her imperious tones backlit by Warren Ellis's meditative ambience".

== Track listing ==
All instrumentation by Warren Ellis.

1. "She Walks in Beauty" (Lord Byron) – 2:37
2. "The Bridge of Sighs" (Thomas Hood) – 4:55
3. "La Belle Dame sans Merci" (John Keats) – 4:15
4. "Ode to a Nightingale" (Keats) – 6:49
5. "To Autumn" (Keats) – 3:16
6. "Ozymandias" (Percy Bysshe Shelley) – 3:08
7. "The Prelude: Book One Introduction" (William Wordsworth) – 2:50
8. "Surprised by Joy" (Wordsworth) – 2:08
9. "To the Moon" (Shelley) – 2:21
10. "So We’ll Go No More a Roving" (Lord Byron) – 2:20
11. "The Lady of Shalott" (Tennyson) – 11:46

== Personnel ==
- Marianne Faithfull – vocals
- Warren Ellis – synthesizer on "She Walks in Beauty" and "Ozymandias", freeze violin on "The Bridge of Sighs" and "The Prelude: Book One Introduction", violin on "La Belle Dame sans Merci" and "Surprised by Joy", sampler loops on "Ode to a Nightingale" and "Ozymandias", synthesizer on "Ode to a Nightingale" and "The Lady of Shalott", bells on "She Walks in Beauty", choir vocal on "She Walks in Beauty", celesta on "The Bridge of Sighs", effects on "The Bridge of Sighs", Boomerang strings samples on "La Belle Dame sans Merci", alto flute on "To Autumn", hyena cello on "To Autumn", glockenspiel on "To Autumn", piano on "To Autumn", choral loop from Sacré-Cœur de Montmartre on "The Prelude: Book One Introduction", sampler loop treatments on "Surprised by Joy", future strings on "To the Moon", bass flute on "So We'll Go No More a Roving", strings on "So We'll Go No More a Roving", effects loops on "The Lady of Shalott", engineering, production
- Nick Cave – piano on "She Walks in Beauty", "The Bridge of Sighs", "La Belle Dame sans Merci", "Ode to a Nightingale", "To Autumn", "Ozymandias", "Surprised by Joy", "To the Moon", and "The Lady of Shalott"; vibraphone on "The Bridge of Sighs", "To Autumn", and "To the Moon"
- John Davis – mastering at Metropolis Studios, London, England, United Kingdom
- Brian Eno – clarinet on "The Bridge of Sighs", synthesizer on "La Belle Dame sans Merci", effects on "La Belle Dame sans Merci", arrangement on "The Bridge of Sighs", engineering on "The Bridge of Sighs" and "La Belle Dame sans Merci"
- Head – effects on "She Walks in Beauty", "To the Moon", and "The Lady of Shalott"; arrangement; piano engineering on "She Walks in Beauty", "The Bridge of Sighs", "La Belle Dame sans Merci", "Ode to a Nightingale", "To Autumn", "Ozymandias", "Surprised by Joy", "To the Moon", and "The Lady of Shalott"; mixing on "She Walks in Beauty", "To the Moon", and "The Lady of Shalott" at Ice House Studios in Milborne Port, Somerset, England, United Kingdom;
- Rosie Matheson – photography
- Yann Orhan – design
- François Ravard – executive production
- Vincent Ségal – cello on "The Bridge of Sighs", "Ode to a Nightingale", "The Prelude: Book One Introduction", and "So We'll Go No More a Roving"
- Colin Self – artwork
- Ben Thackeray – piano engineering on "She Walks in Beauty", "The Bridge of Sighs", "La Belle Dame sans Merci", "Ode to a Nightingale", "To Autumn", "Ozymandias", "Surprised by Joy", "To the Moon", and "The Lady of Shalott"
- Jean-Charles Versari – cello engineering on "The Bridge of Sighs", "Ode to a Nightingale", "The Prelude: Book One Introduction", and "Surprised by Joy"
- Augustin Viard – ondes Martenot on "The Lady of Shalott"

== Chart performance ==
Weekly chart performance for She Walks in Beauty
Chart (2021)	Peak position
Austrian Albums (Ö3 Austria)	21
German Albums (Offizielle Top 100)	28
Belgian Albums (Ultratop Flanders)	37
Belgian Albums (Ultratop Wallonia)	38
Dutch Albums (Album Top 100)	49
Swiss Albums (Schweizer Hitparade)	28
UK Albums (OCC)	88
Scottish Albums (OCC)	17
US Top Album Sales (Billboard)	92
UK Independent Albums (OCC)	7
US Billboard New Age Albums	3

== See also ==
- List of 2021 albums
