= Warren Klein =

American musician and songwriter (born 1944)

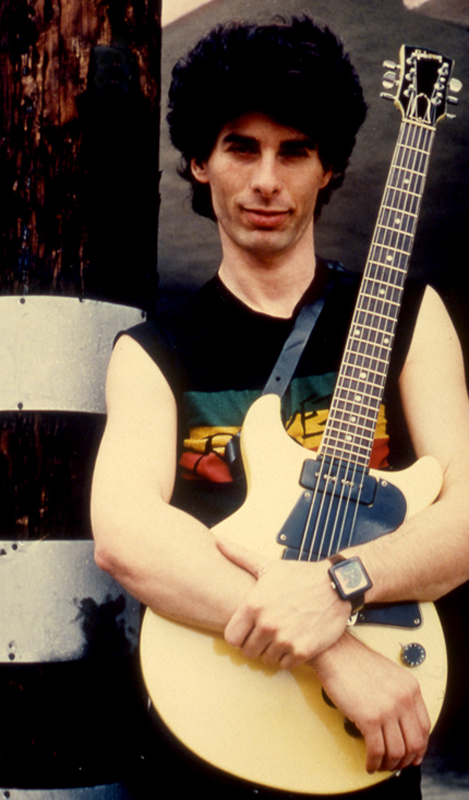
Warren Klein circa 1980.

Warren Klein (born July 27, 1944) is an American musician and songwriter, best known for being a founding member and lead guitarist of The Factory with Lowell George (produced by Frank Zappa), as a member of Fraternity of Man (Don't Bogart Me), and for being a guitarist in the Stooges with Iggy Pop in the spring of 1973.

== Early life ==
Warren Klein was born in Queens New York but grew up in suburban Detroit. He became interested in science and electronics in high school where he and a few others were building a cyclotron particle accelerator, an unheard of project for high school students. Klein built the electronics to control it before moving to Westbury New York at age 17. There he met a contingent of folk musicians and fell in love with the guitar and acoustic guitar finger picking which led to him studying with folk music icon Dave Van Ronk, the “Mayor of McDougal Street” and host of the famous hootenannies at the Gaslight Café featuring performances by the likes of Bob Dylan and other folk music greats.

== Career ==
Leaving his scholarship at Pratt Institute, Klein grabbed his guitar and a sleeping bag and headed to California in a drive-away to Colorado. While hitchhiking in the Colorado desert he was picked up by the Siebrand Brothers Circus and Carnival, stayed with them for a few weeks, then headed off to California where he hoped to start a career in music.

After arriving in Los Angeles Klein became a founding member, lead guitarist, and co-writer in The Factory with Lowell George. They were produced by Frank Zappa and played the notorious “Freak Out” & “Freak In” shows along with the Mothers of Invention at the Shrine Auditorium and Earl Warren Showgrounds. They had several singles released on Uni Records, & their remaining recorded material was later released as “Lowell George & The Factory” on Rhino Records.

When Ravi Shankar started the Kinnara School of Indian Music in Los Angeles, Klein took the opportunity to study sitar and was accepted as a disciple by Ravi not long after. At Ravi's request, Klein composed and performed the electric guitar music over the montage of stills in the Academy Award-winning movie, Charly.

After the Factory broke up, Klein joined the group Fraternity of Man best known for the single “Don't Bogart That Joint” taken from their ABC Dunhill album that was featured in the classic movie Easy Rider. Klein played all the psychedelic leads with the band as well as writing the song “Wispy Paisley Skies” which was in Ang Lee's film Taking Woodstock. The band played at the Magic Mountain Music Festival, the San Francisco Pop Festival, the Hollywood Bowl, numerous love-ins, and a tour with Canned Heat.

Klein then put together The Emergency with Drachen Theaker (The Crazy World of Arthur Brown) and later formed the groups Tornado, Lazer (the original), and The Wolves with Niki Oosterveen. His relationship with Niki, who was managed by film producer Jon Peters, led to him playing the guitar solo that Barbra Streisand dances to in The Main Event.

Other bands he played in were the band Road with Jimi Hendrix's bassist Noel Redding, the band Tarantula at the Vancouver Pop Festival, and The Incredibly Strung-Out Band with Peter Case. When Iggy and The Stooges needed a guitarist for a concert in Chicago, Klein (then nicknamed “Tornado”) was the guy to fill in.

== Discography ==
A partial discography of his recordings includes:

- Peter Case, Doctor Moan - Co-Writer - "Have You Ever Been In Trouble"
- Various Artists, Where the Action Is! Los Angeles Nuggets 1965–1968 – Guitar
- Peter Case, Who's Gonna Go Your Crooked Mile? – Tamboura
- Peter Case, Beeline – Tamboura
- Peter Case, Peter Case- Tamboura
- Little Feat, Hotcakes & Outtakes: 30 Years of Little Feat – Dulcimer, Guitar
- Marshall Crenshaw, Downtown – Tamboura
- Beck, Mutations – Tamboura, Sitar
- Beck, "Nobody's Fault But My Own" – Tamboura, Sitar
- Various Artists, All Day Thumbsucker Revisited – Guitar
- Lowell George & The Factory, Lightning-Rod Man – Guitar, songwriter
- Emil Richards & The Factory – Guitar, songwriter
- Easy Rider Soundtrack – Guitar, composer
- Broken Homes, Broken Homes – Tamboura
- Kim Fowley, I'm Bad – Guitar
- João Donato, A Bad Donato – Guitar
- Echo Park, Echo Park Soundtrack – Sitar
- Peter Ivers, Nirvana Peter – Guitar
- Fraternity of Man, Fraternity of Man 1968 Guitar, Sitar, Tamboura, songwriter
- Fraternity of Man, Get It On – Guitar, Sitar, Tamboura
- Judy Mayhan, Moments – Sitar

== Movie credits ==
- Easy Rider – Guitar and background vocals (Don't Bogart That Joint)
- Grand Theft Auto - Guitar
- The Main Event – Guitar for Barbra Streisand dance
- Airplane! – Guitar
- Charly – Guitar, Composer for the montage of stills
- American Pop – Guitar
- Love Potion No. 9 – Sitar
- Taking Woodstock – Guitar & Songwriter (Whispy Paisly Skies)

== Television credits ==
- Stranger Things – song placement “Every Other Girl”
- Dinah Shore Show – performed original song “Sweet Lady” with Stacy Keach
- F-Troop – Lead Guitar performance.
- Gomer Pyle, U.S.M.C. – Guitar performance, composer

== Interview ==
- I94 Bar from Sydney Australia – https://i94bar.com/interviews/2117-a-tornado-in-the-eye-of-a-storm Klein, Warren
