= Fraternity of Man =

American blues rock and psychedelic rock group

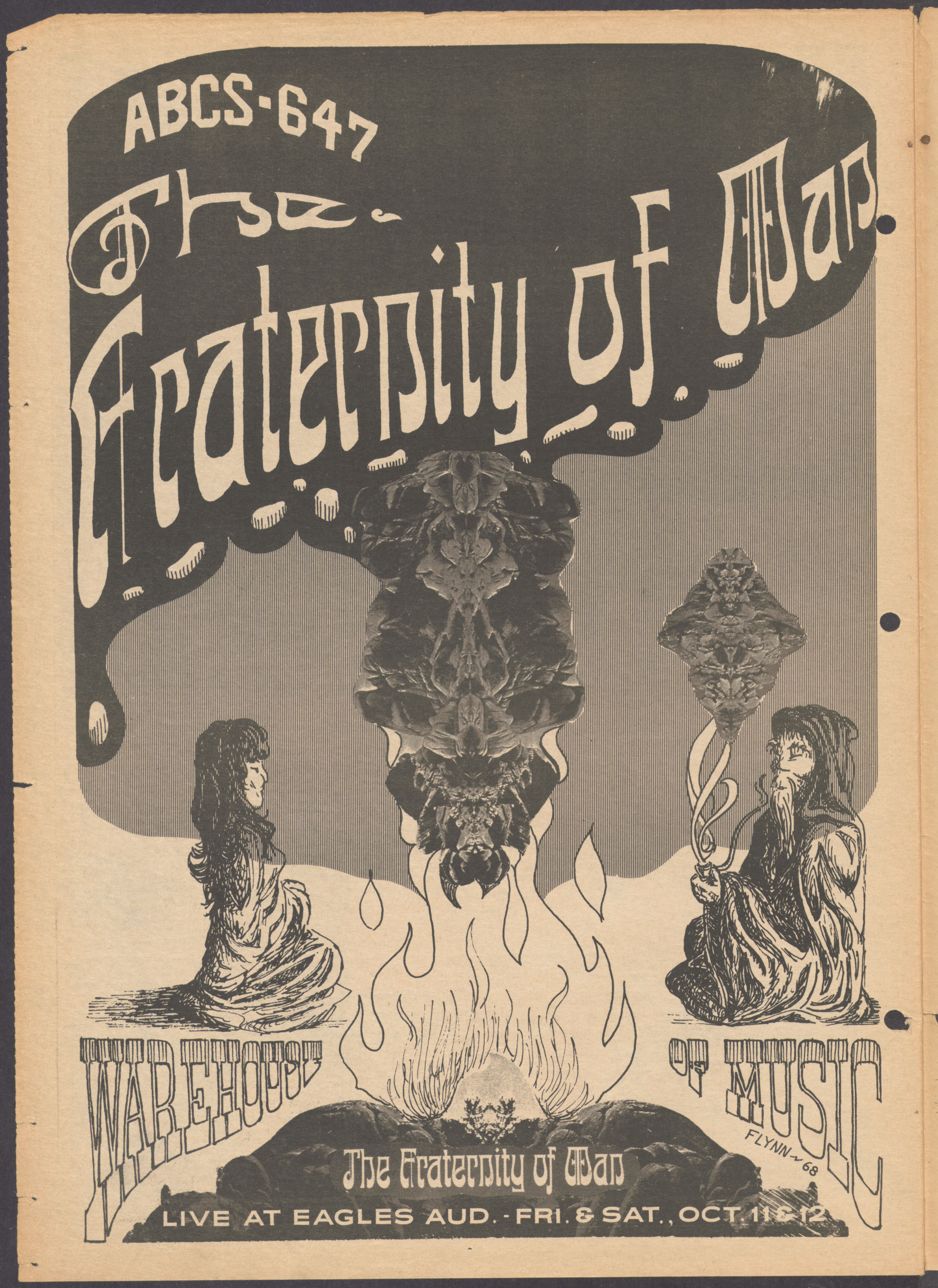
Ad for a performance by Fraternity of Man at Eagles Auditorium, Seattle, 1968.

The Fraternity of Man was an American blues rock and psychedelic rock group from the 1960s. They are most famous for their song "Don't Bogart Me" (a.k.a. "Don't Bogart That Joint"), which was released on LP in 1968, and subsequently used in the 1969 road movie Easy Rider. The original members included three musicians from Lowell George's band The Factory – Richie Hayward (later of Little Feat), Warren Klein, and Martin Kibbee – who joined Elliot Ingber from the Mothers of Invention and Lawrence "Stash" Wagner. Blues leads were handled by Ingber, and psychedelic leads were played by Klein, including "Oh No I Don't Believe It" (widely attributed to Ingber due to his association with the Mothers). The band broke up after recording two albums.

== Discography ==
=== The Fraternity of Man (1968), ABC Records ABCS-647, produced by Tom Wilson ===
All selections written by Fraternity of Man, except where noted.

Side one

1. "In the Morning" - 4:22
2. "Plastic Rat" - 3:41
3. "Don't Bogart Me" - 3:00
4. "Stop Me Citate Me" - 2:50
5. "Bikini Baby" - 2:03
6. "Oh No I Don't Believe It" - (Frank Zappa) - 6:15

Side two

7. "Wispy Paisley Skies" - 2:22
8. "Field Day" - 3:59
9. "Just Doin' Our Job" - 2:21
10. "Blue Guitar" - 4:23
11. "Last Call for Alcohol" - 3:25
12. "Candy Striped Lion's Tails" - 5:17

Personnel

- Lawrence "Stash" Wagner - lead vocals, guitar
- Elliot Ingber - guitar
- Warren Klein - guitar, sitar, tambura
- Martin Kibbee - bass
- Richard Hayward - drums, backing vocals
- Earl Poole Ball - piano

=== Get It On! (1969), Dot Records DLP-25955, produced by Tom Wilson ===
Side one

1. "Boo Man" - 3:14
2. "Don't Start Me Talkin'" - 2:40
3. "Pool of Tears" - 2:46
4. "The Throbber" - 3:40
5. "Cat's Squirrel" - 3:20

Side two

1. "Too High to Eat" - 3:35
2. "Forget Her" - 3:34
3. "Coco Lollipop" - 3:00
4. "Trick Bag" - 2:38
5. "Mellow Token" - 5:33

=== X (1995), San Francisco Sound ===
Disc One (EP)

1. Don't Bogart Me
2. Bikini Baby
3. Fherinst
4. Fuck Her
5. Everybody's Rockin'

Personnel

- Elliot Ingber - guitar
- Lawrence (Stash) Wagner - vocals, harmonica
- Earl Ball - keyboard
- Red Rhodes - steel guitar
- Ira Ingber - bass
- Grisha Dimant - guitar
- Harry Ravain - drums
- Sandy Nelson - percussion
