= Lycée Edgar-Poe =

Coordinates: 48°52′14″N 2°20′53″E

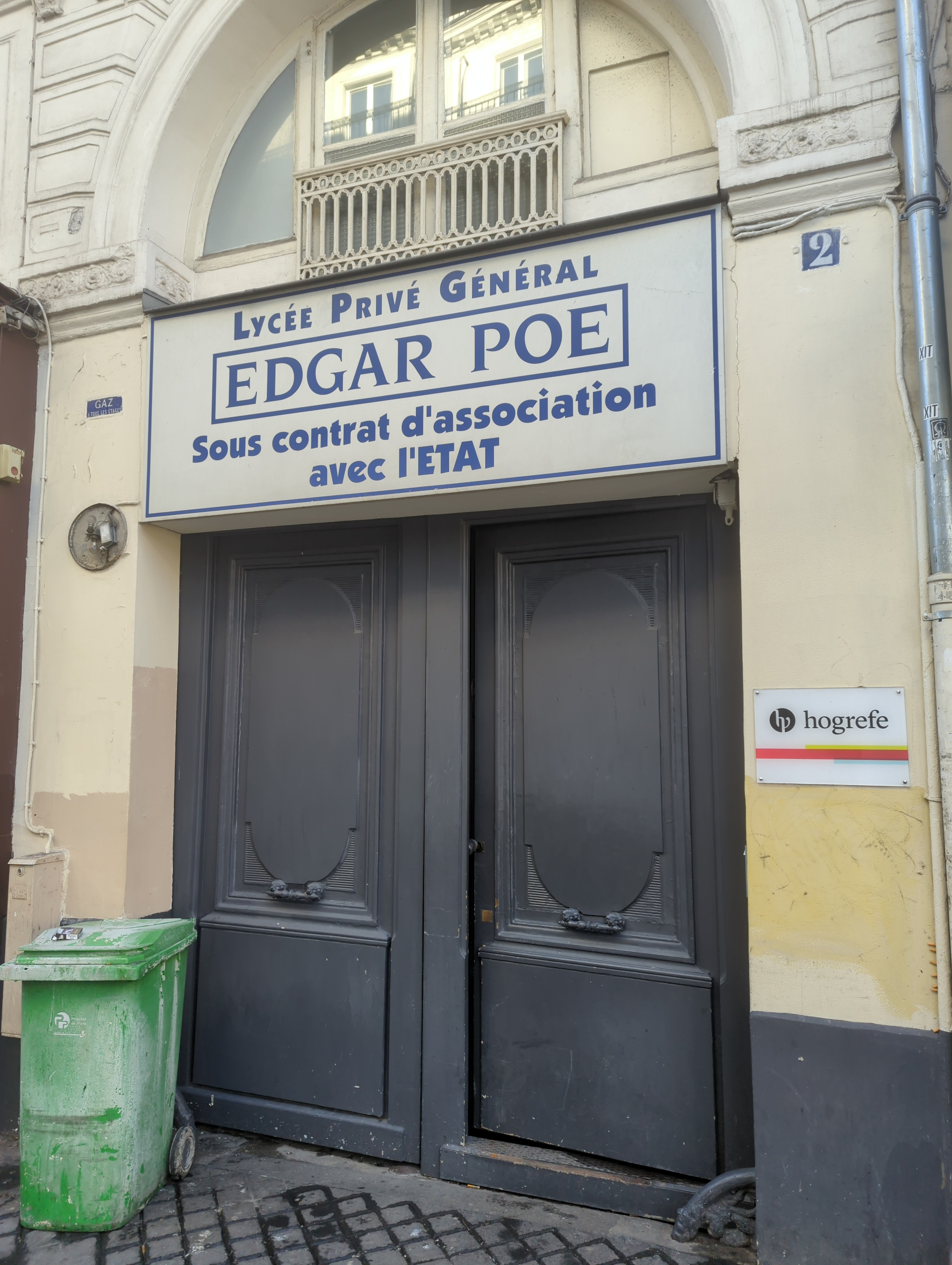
- Paris, Île-de-France; France

Information
- Type: Independent
- Established: 1965
- Director: Ludovic Mouton
- Campus: Urban
- Website: www.lycee-edgarpoe.com

The Lycée Edgar-Poe is a private secondary school located in Paris, 2, rue du Faubourg Poissonnière, in the 10th arrondissement, very close to Le Grand Rex. It is named after the American writer Edgar Allan Poe (1809–1849). This school is far from the rue Edgar-Poe (19th arrondissement of Paris).

Its motto is « L’intérêt pour l’élève développe l’intérêt de l’élève » ('"The interest for the student develops the student's interest"). Its director is Mrs Evelyne Clinet. In 2011, it is the first secondary school of Paris and of the Île-de-France region considering the results at the Baccalauréat.

It is close to the Bonne Nouvelle Paris Métro station.

== History ==
The Lycée Edgar-Poe has been created in 1965 under the name Cours Edgar-Poe and has been recognized by the French State the 26 February 1980. In 1997 the leadership was passed from the schools founder, Jean-Charles sebaoun to Mr. and Mrs. clinet who were long-time math and science teachers at the school.In 2011, it was ranked the top highschool in Paris and Île-de-France for baccalaurèat results.

== Results ==
Results at the Baccalauréat
	2003	2004	2005	2006	2007	2008	2009	2010
Admit	92,00 %	94,00 %	86,00 %	98,00 %	98,00%	95,00 %	97,00 %	99,00 %
Very Good	To be advised	To be advised	To be advised	To be advised	To be advised	To be advised	To be advised	To be advised
Good	To be advised	To be advised	To be advised	To be advised	To be advised	To be advised	To be advised	To be advised
Average	To be advised	To be advised	To be advised	To be advised	To be advised	To be advised	To be advised	To be advised

== Famous alumni ==
- Olivier Caudron (born in 1955), singer.
- François Ravard (born in 1957), French record and film producer.

== See also ==
- Secondary education in France
- Education in France
