= Blonde (soundtrack) =

Blonde (Soundtrack from the Netflix Film)

Film score by Nick Cave and Warren Ellis
- Released: September 28, 2022
- Recorded: 2020–2022
- Genre: Film score; ambient; incidental; experimental; orchestral
- Length: 59:03
- Label: Lakeshore; Invada
- Producer: Nick Cave; Warren Ellis

Nick Cave and Warren Ellis chronology
Dahmer – Monster: The Jeffrey Dahmer Story (2022)	Blonde (2022)

Blonde (Soundtrack from the Netflix Film) (Note: mentioned as Blonde (soundtrack from the Netflix film) in digital album cover) is the score album composed and produced by Australian musicians Nick Cave and Warren Ellis. It is the soundtrack to the 2022 biographical film Blonde, directed by Andrew Dominik. The film, which is based on the 2000 novel of the same name by Joyce Carol Oates, is a fictionalized take on the life and career of American actress Marilyn Monroe, played by Ana de Armas in the lead. The soundtrack album was released by Lakeshore Records and Invada Records on September 28, 2022.

== Background ==
Both Ellis and Cave, collaborated with Dominik for the fourth time, after scoring for The Assassination of Jesse James by the Coward Robert Ford (2007), and himself serving as a documentarian for Cave with the films, One More Time With Feeling (2016) and This Much I Know to Be True (2022). In a statement to Rolling Stone, Ellis and Cave has said that "Working with Andrew Dominik is always a challenging, but ultimately mind-blowing experience [...] Creating the score for this terrifying and complex reimagining of the Marilyn Monroe story was no different, and, as always, it was a complete privilege to work with him. The darkest of films with a gorgeous spiritual score."

In an earlier interaction to Rolling Stone, Dominik had said that "The most fascinating thing about how Nick and Warren is how quickly they work and yet how often they are in a space where they can’t tell whether what they are doing is 'good' or not [...] It's also interesting how their actual relationship finds its way into the music", and further added:

"There's this piece they did for Blonde — Warren singing into a vocoder and Nick playing this strident piano — when I said to Nick how unusual the two things were. He said, 'I was just hitting the piano like that to try and get his attention. He'd been fucking around with that thing for hours.'"

After the film's Netflix release, in October 2022, Cave called Blonde as "one of his favourite films" in response to a fan's interaction on the same.

== Track listing ==
No.	Title	Length
1.	"Pearly"	6:43
2.	"Shard"	2:52
3.	"Fire In The Hills"	3:58
4.	"Gemini"	5:21
5.	"Abortion"	2:31
6.	"Glass Sliver"	1:00
7.	"Gemini Acoustic"	6:05
8.	"Goddess Of Love On A Subway Grating"	2:24
9.	"Strawberry"	1:45
10.	"Bright Horses" (Instrumental)	3:45
11.	"Peroxide"	6:20
12.	"I Love Love Love You All"	3:11
13.	"Wig"	3:22
14.	"Nembutal"	2:54
15.	"A World Of Light"	6:46

== Additional music ==
Additional songs were incorporated into the film, which includes songs from Ladies of the Chorus (1948), Niagara, Gentlemen Prefer Blondes (1953) and Some Like It Hot (1959), starring Marilyn Monroe in the lead. The tracks "Ev-ry Baby Needs a Da-Da-Daddy", "Kiss", "Bye Bye Baby", "Diamonds Are a Girl's Best Friend", "I Wanna Be Loved by You" and "Runnin' Wild" are performed by Monroe, whereas other songs: "Rose and Patrick" and "Strangled" are instrumental pieces composed by Sol Kaplan and "La Cumparsita" (1916) is a traditional song by composer Gerardo Matos Rodriguez. Nick Cave's singles "Warm and Tender" by Fiora Cutler, Tim Davies and Eldad Guetta, and "Bright Horses" by Nick Cave and the Bad Seeds were also featured in the film.

== Reception ==
Critical reception for Cave and Ellis' score were positive, with reviewers highlighting as "one of the positive aspects of the film". Nandini Ramnath of Scroll.in called it as "an ethereal score that foreshadows Monroe’s fate". Calling it as "a gloriously evocative score", Mark Kermode of The Guardian "a melancholy symphony of ambient electronica and eerie voices, interspersed with tinkling acoustic themes that sprinkle a hint of tearful stardust glitter upon a sea of mournful tragedy and despair." Clint Worthington of Consequence had called the score as "arresting and hypnotic", while Siddhant Adlakha of IGN called it as "gentle" and "glamorous". Kaveh Jalinous of Under the Radar wrote that "the film’s score, composed by Nick Cave and Warren Ellis, is hauntingly beautiful and perfectly connects with the images on-screen".

Analysing the film's music, BBC's Rafa Sales Ross wrote "It is in great part due to the soulful empathy of Cave and Ellis's music that Blonde manages to prod at unyielding melancholia without ever needing to resort to a cheap tugging of emotional heartstrings. When Norma Jeane stumbles upon a calming love, the skin-tingling synthesiser beats employed to mark the pace of the woman's sexual escapades give way to the stirring falsettos of Nick Cave and the Bad Seeds' Bright Horses, a song that plays like a hymn, written in memory of Cave's late son. It foreshadows the imminent sorrow doomed to drown all sense of joy and, still, for a brief moment in time, one gets a glimpse of what could have been." Jeremy Urquhart of Collider, in defense of the film against its polarizing critical reviews, had praised the music, saying "the sparse, eerie pieces of music are perfect accompaniments to Blonde's story and visuals, with an instrumental from their 2019 song, "Bright Horses," proving particularly moving during one of the film's rare (semi) hopeful moments."

== Charts ==
Chart performance for Blonde
Chart (2022–2023)	Peak position
Belgian Albums (Ultratop Flanders)	177
Scottish Albums (OCC)	92
UK Soundtrack Albums (OCC)	5
