= Horses and High Heels =

Studio album by Marianne Faithfull
- Released: 31 January 2011 (EU); 7 March 2011 (UK); 28 June 2011 (US)
- Recorded: September–October 2010
- Genre: Rock; blues; jazz
- Length: 52:10
- Label: Dramatico, Naïve
- Producer: Hal Willner

Marianne Faithfull chronology
Easy Come, Easy Go (2008)	Horses and High Heels (2011)	Give My Love to London (2014)

Horses and High Heels is the 18th studio album release by British singer Marianne Faithfull. The 13-track album was released on 31 January 2011 in continental Europe and on 7 March 2011 in the UK on the Dramatico record label. It was released in the United States on 28 June 2011 via the French Naïve Records label.

"Why Did We Have to Part?" was released as a single from the album.

== Background and context ==
Recorded in New Orleans at Piety Street Recording in the Bywater in September and October 2010, the album features cover versions of 1960s classics and seven new songs, four of which were co-written by Faithfull herself. One of the new songs, "The Old House", was specially written for her by Irish playwright Frank McGuiness. There are two cameo appearances on guitar from Lou Reed with further cameos from Dr. John and MC5's Wayne Kramer. The album was produced by long-term collaborator Hal Willner.

== Critical reception ==
Rolling Stone gave the album a three-star rating, stating it is "heavy with lost love and Faithfull's honey-over-gravel voice."

== Track listing ==
1. "The Stations" (Greg Dulli, Mark Lanegan) – 4:24
2. "Why Did We Have To Part" (Laurent Voulzy, Faithfull) – 3:45
3. "That’s How Every Empire Falls" (R.B. Morris) – 5:51
4. "No Reason" (Jackie Lomax) – 2:51
5. "Prussian Blue" (David Courts, Faithfull) – 5:03
6. "Love Song" (Lesley Duncan) – 4:37
7. "Gee Baby" (J.J. Johnson, Mary Alma Baker, Sylvia Robinson, Tyler T. Texas) – 2:49
8. "Goin' Back" (Carole King, Gerry Goffin) – 3:41
9. "Past Present and Future" (Arthur Butler, George "Shadow" Morton, Jerry Leiber) – 2:46
10. "Horses and High Heels" (Doug Pettibone, Faithfull) – 3:52
11. "Back in Baby’s Arms" (Allen Toussaint) – 4:19
12. "Eternity" (Doug Pettibone, Faithfull) – 4:03
13. "The Old House" (Frank McGuiness, Leo Abrahams) – 4:04

Bonus tracks on the vinyl edition:

1. "Fragile Weapon" (Devon T. Williams)
2. "I Don´t Wanna Know" (Rupert Charles Guidy)

== Charts ==
Chart (2011)	Peak position
Austrian Albums Chart	68
Dutch Mega Albums Chart	78
French Albums Chart	37
Italian Albums (FIMI)	91
Swedish Albums Chart	34
Swiss Albums Chart	26
UK Independent Albums (OCC)	16
UK Jazz & Blues Albums (OCC)	6

In 2011 it was awarded a double silver certification from the Independent Music Companies Association which indicated sales of at least 40,000 copies throughout Europe.
