= Kissin Time =

Studio album by Marianne Faithfull
- Released: 19 February 2002
- Recorded: 2001–2002
- Genre: Electronic rock
- Label: Hut/Virgin
- Producers: Beck, Tony Hoffer, Billy Corgan, Dave Stewart, Jarvis Cocker, Steve Mackey, Étienne Daho, Les Valentins, Ben Hillier, Barry Reynolds

Marianne Faithfull chronology
Vagabond Ways (1999)	Kissin Time (2003)	Before the Poison (2005)

Professional ratings
Review scores
Source	Rating
AllMusic	4/5 stars
Pitchfork Media	(7.1/10)
Rolling Stone	3/5 stars

Kissin Time is the 15th studio album by British singer Marianne Faithfull.

== Overview ==
After turns as a neo-cabaret/slow ballad crooner in previous works (represented by her 1990s works with Hal Willner, Angelo Badalamenti and the interpretation of Brecht/Weill standards), Faithfull was eager to collaborate with contemporary musicians. She co-wrote almost all the songs, and worked with several notable musicians who produced the tracks.

The song "Kissin Time" is the result of a collaboration between her and Blur, and is, according to Faithfull, "sort of about Damon (Albarn) and sort of about me." Beck, who worked with her in Los Angeles, is responsible for the tracks "Sex With Strangers", "Like Being Born" and "Nobody's Fault". While the first one is an electro-funk sprechstimme track, influenced by Serge Gainsbourg and Beck's Midnite Vultures, the other two tend to a more folk/country/Leonard Cohen path. 'Nobody's Fault' previously appeared on Beck's album Mutations under the title "Nobody's Fault but My Own" in 1999. Beck's collaborations were co-produced by Tony Hoffer.

"The Pleasure Song", which was included on the soundtrack of the cable television series The L Word, was written in Paris with Les Valentines (the duo Edith Fambuena and Jean Louis Pierot) and French singer Étienne Daho. Billy Corgan contributed to three songs: the reworking of the 1960s Goffin/King success "Something Good", the hymnal and synth-layered "I'm On Fire", and the reflective acoustic pop of "Wherever I Go", about which Faithfull declared "that's Billy trying to sit down and write Marianne a hit."

The "Song For Nico" was written by Faithfull and Dave Stewart after reading a biography of the German singer/songwriter/actress/model, who Faithfull identified with even though, as she said, "Nico had tremendous injustice in her life, and I've had tremendous luck." The singer also declared that this tune "is one of the best things I've ever written."

About the biographical "Sliding Through Life on Charm", Faithfull said, "I'd been trying to write this song for 20 years, always getting stuck because I couldn't find a fucking rhyme. And I thought, when I see that Jarvis Cocker — so I grabbed him in this television studio one day and said 'Now, look, I want you to take this title and go and write a song from it'. And off he went. And then he took another year and a half before I got it — and then it took another year and a half before I understood it enough to record it."

== Track listing ==
No.	Title	Writer(s)	Producer	Length
1.	"Sex with Strangers" (featuring Beck)	Marianne Faithfull, Beck Hansen	Beck, Tony Hoffer	4:21
2.	"The Pleasure Song"	Faithfull, Étienne Daho, Edith Fambuena, Jean Louis Pierot	Étienne Daho, Les Valentins	4:15
3.	"Like Being Born" (featuring Beck)	Faithfull, Hansen	Beck, Hoffer	3:51
4.	"I'm on Fire" (featuring Billy Corgan)	Faithfull, Billy Corgan	Billy Corgan	3:03
5.	"Wherever I Go" (featuring Billy Corgan)	Corgan	Corgan	2:25
6.	"Song for Nico" (featuring Dave Stewart)	Faithfull, Dave Stewart	Dave Stewart	3:59
7.	"Sliding Through Life on Charm" (featuring Jarvis Cocker)	Faithfull, Jarvis Cocker, Steve Mackey, Mark Webber, Nick Banks	Jarvis Cocker, Steve Mackey	4:00
8.	"Love & Money"	Faithfull, David Courts	Barry Reynolds	2:17
9.	"Nobody's Fault" (featuring Beck)	Hansen	Beck, Hoffer	6:28
10.	"Kissin Time" (featuring Blur)	Faithfull, Alex James, Damon Albarn, Dave Rowntree, Graham Coxon	Ben Hillier	5:39
11.	"Something Good" (featuring Billy Corgan)	Carole King, Gerry Goffin	Cogan	3:24

Bonus track on the Japanese edition
No.	Title	Writer(s)	Producer	Length
12.	"Sex with Strangers" (Sly & Robbie Sex Ref Mix)	Faithfull, Hansen	Beck, Hoffer	4:57

Bonus tracks on the 2023 reissue
No.	Title	Writer(s)	Producer	Length
12.	"Sex with Strangers" (Sly & Robbie Sex Ref Mix)	Faithfull, Hansen	Beck, Hoffer	4:57
13.	"The Pleasure Song" (Rough Mix)	Faithfull, Daho, Fambuena, Pierot		4:06
14.	"Kissin Time" (Jacknife Lee / The Freelance Hellraiser Remix)	Faithfull, James, Albarn, Rowntree, Coxon		3:35
15.	"Sex with Strangers" (Sly & Robbie Dub Mix)	Faithfull, Hansen		4:31
16.	"The World Between" (Church Sessions Version)	Faithfull, Stewart		5:35
17.	"The Pleasure Song" (Church Sessions Version)	Faithfull, Daho, Fambuena, Pierot		3:35
18.	"If You Don't Touch Yourself" (Church Sessions Version)	Faithfull, Stewart		5:14

== Production credits ==
- Marianne Faithfull - vocals, backing vocals, synthesizer, percussion, hand-clapping
- Beck - producer, programming, guitar, synthesizer, percussion, backing vocals
- Tony Hoffer - producer, programming, engineer, mixing
- Justin Meldal-Johnsen - bass on "Sex With Strangers"
- Jon Brion - celeste, drums, Chamberlain, harmonium
- Smokey Hormel - guitar
- Étienne Daho - producer
- Edith Fambuena - producer, guitar
- Jean Louis Pierot - producer, keyboards
- David A. Stewart - producer, bass, guitar
- Billy Corgan - producer, bass, guitar, keyboards, programming, backing vocals, engineer, mixing
- Shawn Christopher - backing vocals on "I'm On Fire"
- Paris Delane - backing vocals on "I'm On Fire"
- Matt Walker - drums
- Ben Hillier - producer, engineer, mixing, hand-clapping
- Barry Reynolds - producer, bass, guitar, programming, mixing
- Ned Douglas - keyboards, programming
- Mark Price - drums
- Bertrand "Mako" Blais - programming
- Gavin Skinner - drums
- Blur:
  - Damon Albarn - guitar, keyboards, backing vocals, hand-clapping
  - Graham Coxon - guitar
  - Alex James - bass, hand-clapping
  - Dave Rowntree - drums, hand-clapping
- Pulp:
  - Jarvis Cocker - producer, keyboards
  - Steve Mackey - producer, bass
  - Mark Webber - guitar
  - Nick Banks - drums

Technical

- Howard Willing - pre-production
- Clive Goddard - engineer, mixing
- Bjorn Thorsrud - engineer, mixing
- Nick Addison - engineer
- Jean-Paul Gonnod - engineer
- Chris Potter - engineer
- Howie Weinberg - mastering
- Tim Young - mastering
- Nick Knight - photography
- Paul Hetherington - graphic design, art direction, design
- Howard Wakefield - graphic design

== Charts ==
Chart (2002)	Peak position
Austrian Albums (Ö3 Austria)	42
Belgian Albums (Ultratop Flanders)	40
European Albums (Eurotipsheet)	92
French Albums (SNEP)	39
German Albums (Offizielle Top 100)	49
Swiss Albums (Schweizer Hitparade)	47
