= Mutations (Beck album) =

Studio album by Beck
- Released: November 3, 1998
- Recorded: March 19–April 3, 1998
- Studio: Ocean Way (Hollywood)
- Genres: Folk rock; psychedelia; country
- Length: 49:17
- Labels: DGC; Bong Load
- Producers: Beck Hansen; Nigel Godrich

Beck chronology
Odelay (1996)	Mutations (1998)	Midnite Vultures (1999)

Singles from Mutations
- 1. "Tropicalia" Released: December 7, 1998; 2. "Cold Brains" Released: March 1, 1999; 3. "Nobody's Fault but My Own" Released: April 21, 1999 (Japan)

Mutations is the sixth studio album by the American songwriter Beck, released on November 3, 1998, by DGC Records. Though less commercially successful than the preceding Odelay, it won a Grammy Award for Best Alternative Music Album.

== Background and recording ==
Mutations was produced by Nigel Godrich, who was known at that point for producing Radiohead's OK Computer. The album contains a number of Moog keyboards, acoustic guitars, and string arrangements. The production style was very different from that of Beck's previous album Odelay, which was heavily influenced by hip hop music and contained many samples. The lyrics are also much more somber and serious than those on Odelay, apparent in the songs "Nobody's Fault but My Own" and "Dead Melodies".

== Artwork and packaging ==
The record's front cover, a picture of Beck tangled in plastic wrap, was taken by the music photographer Autumn de Wilde. Art direction was by designer Robert Fisher. The interior artwork features sculptures and drawings by artist Tim Hawkinson.

== Release ==
Before beginning the recording sessions, Beck gained permission from the major label he was under contract with, Geffen, to release Mutations on the small indie label Bong Load Records. However, when Geffen executives heard the album, they reneged on their agreement and released the record. This led to a lawsuit filed by Beck against Geffen.

Singles were released for the songs "Tropicalia", "Cold Brains" (Australia and New Zealand only), and "Nobody's Fault but My Own" (Japan only). No promotional music videos were made for any of the singles. Beck appeared on Saturday Night Live in promotion of Mutations, performing "Tropicalia" and "Nobody's Fault but My Own".

Mutations reached number 13 in the US, going gold, and achieved 24 in the UK and 23 in Australia. As of July 2008, Mutations has sold 586,000 copies in the United States. As of 1999 it has sold over one million copies worldwide.

== Reception ==
Professional ratings
Review scores
Source	Rating
AllMusic	4/5 stars
Entertainment Weekly	B
The Guardian	4/5 stars
Los Angeles Times	4/4 stars
NME	8/10
Pitchfork	9.0/10
Q	4/5 stars
Rolling Stone	4/5 stars
Spin	8/10
The Village Voice	A−

Mutations received critical acclaim. It gained four stars from Rolling Stone and a 9.0 from Pitchfork. Thomas Ward of AllMusic deemed the record "one of the finest albums of the 1990s".

== Track listing ==
All tracks are written by Beck Hansen.

No.	Title	Length
1.	"Cold Brains"	3:41
2.	"Nobody's Fault but My Own"	5:02
3.	"Lazy Flies"	3:44
4.	"Canceled Check"	3:14
5.	"We Live Again"	3:05
6.	"Tropicalia"	3:20
7.	"Dead Melodies"	2:36
8.	"Bottle of Blues"	4:56
9.	"O Maria"	3:59
10.	"Sing It Again"	4:19
11.	"Static" (includes hidden track (Note: "Static" ends at 4:20, with hidden track "Diamond Bollocks" starting at 5:18))	11:20
Total length:		49:17

Notes

Japanese Edition Bonus Tracks
No.	Title	Length
12.	"Electric Music and the Summer People"	4:39
13.	"Diamond Bollocks"	6:02
14.	"Runners Dial Zero"	4:03

== Personnel ==
- Beck – guitar, harmonica, piano, glockenspiel, synthesizer, vocals, producer
- Elliot Caine – trumpet
- David Campbell – arranger, conductor, viola
- Larry Corbett – cello
- Warren Klein – sitar, tamboura
- Greg Leisz – pedal steel guitar
- Bob Ludwig – mastering
- David Ralicke – flute, trombone
- Nigel Godrich – producer, mixing
- Smokey Hormel – guitar, percussion, background vocals, cuica
- Joey Waronker – percussion, drums, synthesizer drums
- Robert Fisher – art direction
- Justin Meldal-Johnsen – bass guitar, double bass, percussion, background vocals
- Roger Manning – synthesizer, organ, keyboards, harpsichord, background vocals, percussion
- John Sorenson – assistant engineer
- Charlie Gross – photography
- Autumn de Wilde – photography

== Charts ==
Chart (1998–1999)	Peak position
Australian Albums (ARIA)	24
Canadian Albums (Billboard)	6
Finnish Albums (Suomen virallinen lista)	40
French Albums (SNEP)	36
German Albums (Offizielle Top 100)	49
New Zealand Albums (RMNZ)	24
Norwegian Albums (VG-lista)	18
Scottish Albums (Official Charts)	37
Swedish Albums (Sverigetopplistan)	29
Swiss Albums (Schweizer Hitparade)	46
UK Albums (Official Charts)	24
US Billboard 200	13

== Certifications ==
Region	Certification	Certified units/sales
Canada (Music Canada)	Platinum	100,000^{^}
Japan (RIAJ)	Gold	100,000^{^}
United Kingdom (BPI)	Gold	100,000^{*}
United States (RIAA)	Gold	586,000
Summaries
Worldwide	—	1,000,000
^{*} Sales figures based on certification alone.^{^} Shipments figures based on certification alone.
