= The Seven Deadly Sins (album) =

Studio album by Marianne Faithfull
- Released: September 15, 1998
- Recorded: June 1997
- Genre: Musical theatre, jazz, classical crossover
- Length: 50:43
- Label: BMG
- Producer: Malgorzata Kragora

Marianne Faithfull chronology
20th Century Blues (1996)	The Seven Deadly Sins (1998)	Vagabond Ways (1999)

Professional ratings
Review scores
Source	Rating
AllMusic	4/5 stars

The Seven Deadly Sins is a studio recording of the Kurt Weill opera of the same name by British singer Marianne Faithfull, released in 1998.

== Background and recording ==
Marianne Faithfull had already performed The Seven Deadly Sins live at St. Anne's Cathedral in Brooklyn, but it was only after working with Dennis Russell Davies on 20th Century Blues that the idea of recording the opera came to her. Davies agreed to collaborate again with her, and the album was recorded in June 1997 at the Vienna Konzerthaus with Davies conducting the Vienna Radio Symphony orchestra.

The recording also includes other songs by Weill & Brecht like the "Alabama Song" and songs from The Threepenny Opera, which Marianne Faithfull also performed live in 1992 at the Dublin Gate Theater, playing the role of the prostitute Jenny and interpreting the famous Pirate Jenny song.

== Track listing ==
All tracks are written by Kurt Weill except where noted

No.	Title	Writer(s)	Length
1.	"Prologue"	Weill, Bertolt Brecht	3:50
2.	"Sloth"		3:57
3.	"Pride"		4:50
4.	"Anger"		4:52
5.	"Gluttony"		3:32
6.	"Lust"		5:21
7.	"Covetousness"		3:02
8.	"Envy"		4:31
9.	"Epilogue"		1:30
10.	"Alabama Song"	Weill, Brecht	2:56
11.	"The Ballad of Sexual Dependency"		2:38
12.	"Bilbao Song"	Weill, Brecht, Johnny Mercer	5:05
13.	"Pirate Jenny"	Weill, Brecht	4:34

== Personnel ==
- Marianne Faithfull – vocals
- Dennis Russell Davies – Conductor
- Recorded with the Vienna Radio Symphony orchestra

== Charts ==
Chart (1998)	Peak position
US Top Classical Albums (Billboard)	38
