= No Exit (Marianne Faithfull album) =

Live album by Marianne Faithfull
- Released: 30 September 2016
- Recorded: 15 December 2014 (main album); 2 February 2016 (video bonus tracks)
- Venue: Bela Bartók National Concert Hall, Müpa Budapest, Budapest, Hungary; The Roundhouse, Chalk Farm, London, England, United Kingdom
- Length: 44:47
- Language: English
- Label: earMusic
- Producer: Claudia Lee

Marianne Faithfull chronology
| Give My Love to London (2014) | No Exit (2016) | Negative Capability (2018) |

No Exit is a 2016 live album by English pop singer Marianne Faithfull. The album was released as both an audio work and a concert film made up of a 92-minute performance in 2014 and a bonus 30-minute collection of songs from 2016.

== Reception ==
Editors at AllMusic rated this album 3.5 out of 5 stars, with critic Thom Jurek writing this album "is immediate; even raw in places" and that Faithfull's "now-ravaged, grainy voice continues to possess a power and expressivity that commands lyrics authoritatively and experientially", summing up that "it belongs on every Faithfull fan's shelf". At Louder Sound, Chris Roberts scored this album 3.5 out of 5 stars, writing that "the visual element works better" for the "moody songs"; he also praises the musicianship of the backing band but criticizes that the production sounds tinny.

== Track listing ==
Compact disc and vinyl record track listing

1. Intro – 2:07
2. "Falling Back" (Anna Calvi and Marianne Faithfull) – 3:54
3. "The Price of Love" (Donald Everly and Phil Everly) – 3:00
4. "Love More or Less" (Faithfull and Tom McRae) – 4:10
5. "As Tears Go By" (Mick Jagger and Keith Richards) – 3:06
6. "Mother Wolf" (Faithfull and Patrick Leonard) – 4:35
7. "Sister Morphine" (Faithfull, Jagger, and Richards) – 7:36
8. "Late Victorian Holocaust" (Nick Cave) – 6:14
9. "Sparrows Will Sing" (Roger Waters) – 4:07
10. "The Ballad of Lucy Jordan" (Shel Silverstein) – 5:56

Blu-Ray and DVD edition

Live in Budapest (Recorded 15.12.2014)

1. "Give My Love to London" (Steve Earle and Faithfull)
2. "Falling Back" (Calvi and Faithfull)
3. "Broken English" (Faithfull and Barry Reynolds)
4. "Witches Song" (Faithfull and Reynolds)
5. "Price of Love" (D. Everly and P. Everly)
6. "Marathon Kiss" (Daniel Lanois)
7. "Love More or Less" (Faithfull and McRae)
8. "As Tears Go By" (Jagger and Richards)
9. "Come and Stay with Me" (Del Shannon)
10. "Mother Wolf" (Faithfull and Leonard)
11. "Sister Morphine" (Faithfull, Jagger, and Richards)
12. "Late Victorian Holocaust" (Cave)
13. "Sparrows Will Sing" (Waters)
14. "The Ballad of Lucy Jordan" (Silverstein)
15. "Who Will Take My Dreams Away" (Angelo Badalamenti and Faithfull)
16. "Last Song" (Damon Albarn and Faithfull)

Extract from Live in London (Roundhouse 02.02.2016)

17. "Give My Love to London" (Faithfull)
18. "It’s All Over Now Baby Blue" (Bob Dylan)
19. "Late Victorian Holocaust" (Cave)
20. "Sister Morphine" (Faithfull, Jagger, and Richards)

== Personnel ==
- Marianne Faithfull – vocals
- Jonny Bridgwood – bass guitar
- Rob Ellis – drums, synthesizer, backing vocals, musical direction, mixing (CD tracks)
- Ed Harcourt – piano, synthesizer, backing vocals
- Rob Mcvey – guitar, backing vocals

Technical personnel

- Tom Bowles – direction
- Howard Bullivant – live sound engineering, mixing (film tracks)
- Eric Cornic – graphic design
- John Dent – mastering
- DR – photography
- Krisztián Kovács Ender – direction
- Head – mixing (London tracks)
- Viktor Homonnay – director of photography
- Péter Koncseg – video engineering
- Claudia Lee – production (London recordings)
- Corky Siegel – mixing (CD tracks)
- Dragon Tamás – mixing (Budapest recordings)

== See also ==
- List of 2016 albums

== Charts ==
| Chart (2016) | Peak position |
|---|---|
| French Albums (SNEP) | 199 |
| Belgian Albums (Ultratop Flanders) | 90 |
