= Give My Love to London =

Studio album by Marianne Faithfull
- Released: 29 September 2014
- Genre: Rock, alternative rock
- Label: Dramatico, Naïve, Easy Sound
- Producer: Dimitri Tikovoï, Rob Ellis

Marianne Faithfull chronology
Horses and High Heels (2011)	Give My Love to London (2014)	No Exit (2016)

Give My Love to London is the 19th studio album by British singer Marianne Faithfull. The 11-track album was released on 29 September 2014 on the Dramatico and Naïve record labels. In America and Canada, it was issued on 10 November by Easy Sound. It includes collaborations with Nick Cave, Anna Calvi, Roger Waters and Brian Eno. "Sparrows Will Sing" was released as a single from the album.

According to Metacritic, Give My Love to London has received "Generally favorable reviews" from music critics, based on a sample of 16 professional reviews. Among other critiques, The Sunday Times included the album among its "essential new releases", with the reviewer writing: "[Faithfull] is more a work of performance art than a singer … But for die-hard fans, of course, that is part of the mystique."

Professional ratings
Aggregate scores
Source	Rating
Metacritic	80/100
Review scores
Source	Rating
AllMusic	4/5 stars
The Guardian	3/5 stars
Mojo	4/5 stars
Pitchfork	8.0/10
Record Collector	4/5 stars
Uncut	8/10

== Track listing ==
1. "Give My Love to London" (Marianne Faithfull, Steve Earle) – 3:56
2. "Sparrows Will Sing" (Roger Waters) – 3:51
3. "True Lies" (Dimitri Tikovoï, Ed Harcourt, Faithfull) – 2:29
4. "Love More or Less" (Faithfull, Tom McRae) – 3:27
5. "Late Victorian Holocaust" (Nick Cave) – 4:27
6. "The Price of Love" (Don Everly, Phil Everly) – 2:16
7. "Falling Back" (Faithfull, Anna Calvi) – 3:49
8. "Deep Water" (Cave, Faithfull) – 3:08
9. "Mother Wolf" (Faithfull, Patrick Leonard) – 4:07
10. "Going Home" (Leonard Cohen, Leonard) – 4:23
11. "I Get Along Without You Very Well (Except Sometimes)" (Hoagy Carmichael) – 3:45

== Personnel ==
- Marianne Faithfull – vocals (1–11)
- Natalia Bonner – 2nd violin (5, 7, 11)
- Ian Burdge – cello (5, 7, 11)
- Anna Calvi – backing vocals (6, 7)
- Gillon Cameron – 1st violin (5, 7, 11)
- Ben Christophers – backing vocals (2), synthesizer (4), Pixiphone (5, 8), harmonium (8), harp (11)
- Steve Earle – guitar (1)
- Rob Ellis – percussion (1, 2, 6, 7, 9), harmonium (1), piano (2), synthesizer (2), drums (2, 6, 7), backing vocals (2, 6, 7, 10), string arrangement (5, 7, 11)
- Warren Ellis – violin (1, 5), viola (1, 9), alto flute (8)
- Brian Eno – backing vocals (10)
- Flood – tambourine (7)
- Ed Harcourt – bass (2, 11), piano (3–11), backing vocals (3, 5, 7, 9, 10), organ (4, 9)
- Andy Hughes – backing vocals (2)
- Mick Jones – guitar (1), bells (1)
- Tom McRae – guitar (4)
- Emma Owens – viola (5, 7, 11)
- Jim Sclavunos – drums (3)
- Son of Dave – harmonica (6)
- Dimitri Tikovoï – bass (1, 3, 5–7), percussion (1, 2, 6, 9), piano (2), drums (2, 9), backing vocals (2), acoustic guitar (3), organ (3), string arrangement (8)
- Adrian Utley – guitar (1–7, 9–11)

== Charts ==
Chart (2014)	Peak position
Belgian Albums (Ultratop Flanders)	31
Belgian Albums (Ultratop Wallonia)	42
Danish Albums (Hitlisten)	30
Dutch Albums (Album Top 100)	51
French Albums (SNEP)	16
German Albums (Offizielle Top 100)	60
Greek Albums (IFPI)	31
Italian Albums (FIMI)	69
Norwegian Albums (VG-lista)	37
Scottish Albums (OCC)	72
Swiss Albums (Schweizer Hitparade)	25
UK Albums (OCC)	64
UK Independent Albums (OCC)	14
