= Easy Come, Easy Go (Marianne Faithfull album) =

Studio album by Marianne Faithfull
- Released: 10 November 2008 (EU); 14 February 2009 (AUS); 16 March 2009 (UK); 17 March 2009 (US)
- Recorded: Sear Sound, New York City
- Labels: Naïve Records; Decca (US); Dramatico Records (UK); Shock Records (AUS)
- Producer: Hal Willner

Marianne Faithfull chronology
Before the Poison (2005)	Easy Come, Easy Go (2008)	Horses and High Heels (2011)

Professional ratings
Review scores
Source	Rating
Robert Christgau	A
Gigwise.com	3.5/5 stars
Pitchfork Media	(7.5/10)
The Guardian	3/5 stars
BBC	Positive

Easy Come, Easy Go is a studio album of cover versions by English singer Marianne Faithfull, which was released in the EU on 10 November 2008. The album is produced by Hal Willner and features guest appearances from a variety of musicians. It was released as both a standard 10-track CD and a special 18-track edition with a DVD documentary by Anne Rohart under Jean-Baptiste Mondino's artistic direction, with both Faithfull and Wilner commenting on the song selection. A collectible 2-disc vinyl pressing is also available. The album was recorded with Pro Tools in NYC at the Sear Sound Studio.

== Release ==
The EU release on Naive was 10 November 2008.

The album has so far peaked at No. 100 on the UK Albums Chart as reported on The Official UK Chart Company website on 23 March 2009 and became her first album to chart on the U.S. Billboard 200 chart since 1990. The album peaked at No. 23 on the Australian Top 50 Jazz & Blues Album Year End Chart.

In 2014 it was awarded a gold certification from the Independent Music Companies Association, which indicated sales of at least 75,000 copies throughout Europe.

== Critical reception ==
Easy Come, Easy Go received positive reviews from music critics. Metacritic, which assigns a weighted average based on ratings from publications, gave the album a 76 out of 100 based on eighteen reviews, indicating "generally favourable reviews".

AllMusic praised the album, noting that "Ms. Faithfull shows up in excellent form throughout this offering. If you are patient, there is more than enough here to hold your attention and take you on journeys through love, lust, tragedy, and longing and bring you home again."

Pitchfork observed that "she may not sell as well or enjoy their prominent rock status, but I'd bet there's more concentrated excitement over a new Marianne Faithfull album than any new Rolling Stones release could inspire in even their hardiest fan...She's the Helen Mirren of rock'n'roll: a dish in the 1960s who has not only aged incredibly well, but wears her age with as much grace as others wear their youth. "

== Track listing ==
Disc 1:

1. "Down from Dover" (originally by Dolly Parton)
2. "Hold On, Hold On", with Cat Power (originally by Neko Case)
3. "Solitude" (originally by Duke Ellington)
4. "The Crane Wife 3", with Nick Cave (originally by The Decemberists)
5. "Easy Come, Easy Go" (originally by Bessie Smith)
6. "Children of Stone", with Rufus Wainwright (originally by Espers)
7. "How Many Worlds", with Teddy Thompson (originally by Brian Eno)
8. "In Germany Before the War" (originally by Randy Newman)
9. "Ooh Baby Baby", with Anohni Hegarty (originally by Smokey Robinson)
10. "Sing Me Back Home", with Keith Richards (originally by Merle Haggard)

Disc 2:

1. "Salvation", with Sean Lennon (originally by Black Rebel Motorcycle Club)
2. "Black Coffee" (originally by Sarah Vaughan)
3. "The Phoenix", with Kate & Anna McGarrigle (originally by Judee Sill)
4. "Dear God Please Help Me" (originally by Morrissey)
5. "Kimbie" (originally by Jackson C. Frank)
6. "Many a Mile to Freedom", with Jenni Muldaur (originally by Traffic)
7. "Somewhere (A Place for Us)", with Jarvis Cocker (originally by Leonard Bernstein and Stephen Sondheim)
8. "Flandyke Shore", with Kate & Anna McGarrigle (traditional, also sung by Nic Jones)

== Personnel ==
- Producer – Hal Willner

Musicians: - According to the booklet accompanying the album:

- Marianne Faithfull: Vocals
- Barry Reynolds: Guitars
- Marc Ribot: Electric and acoustic guitars
- Keith Richards: Guitar, vocals (Disc 1; 10)
- Sean Lennon: Guitars, vocals (Disc 2; 1)
- Greg Cohen: Bass
- Gil Goldstein: Piano, accordion, arrangements, string direction
- Brian Mitchell: Piano
- Steve Weisberg: Piano, electric piano, Celesta, arrangements, conducting
- Rob Burger: Piano, organ
- Maxin Moston, Rob Moose: Violin
- Warren Ellis: Violin, electric violin
- Michael Nicholas: Viola
- Jane Scarpantoni: Cello
- Art Baron: Bass recorder, trombone
- Doug Wieselman: Clarinet, bass clarinet, baritone saxophone
- Ken Peplowski: Bass clarinet
- Marty Ehrlich: Bass clarinet, alto saxophone
- Lenny Pickett: Bass Clarinet, Tenor Saxophone, Sarrusophone, Double Bass
- Steven Bernstein: Glockenspiel, mellophone, alto brass, trumpet
- Jim White: Drums
- Joey Baron: Drums
- Chan Marshall: Vocals
- Nick Cave: Vocals (Disc 1; 4)
- Antony Hegarty: Vocals
- Rufus Wainwright: Vocals (Disc 1; 6)
- Jarvis Cocker: Vocals (Disc 2; 7)
- Kate & Anna McGarrigle: Backing Vocals (Disc 2; 3, 8)
- Cat Power: Backing Vocals (Disc 1; 2)

Cover photography and art direction:

- Jean-Baptiste Mondino

== Charts ==
Chart (2008)	Peak position
Belgian Albums (Ultratop Flanders)	38
Belgian Albums (Ultratop Wallonia)	71
Dutch Albums (Album Top 100)	52
French Albums (SNEP)	35
German Albums (Offizielle Top 100)	51
Italian Albums (FIMI)	57
Spanish Albums (PROMUSICAE)	68
Swedish Albums (Sverigetopplistan)	58
Swiss Albums (Schweizer Hitparade)	28
UK Albums (Official Charts)	100
US Billboard 200	182
Australia (ARIA Jazz and Blues Chart )	2
