= Vagabond Ways =

Studio album by Marianne Faithfull
- Released: 14 April 1999
- Recorded: July 1998
- Studio: Teatro Studios, Oxnard, California
- Genre: Rock
- Label: Instinct Records/EMI
- Producer: Daniel Lanois, Mark Howard

Marianne Faithfull chronology
The Seven Deadly Sins (1998)	Vagabond Ways (1999)	Kissin Time (2002)

Professional ratings
Review scores
Source	Rating
AllMusic	4/5 stars
Rolling Stone	3/5 stars

Vagabond Ways is the 14th studio album by the British singer Marianne Faithfull. This is her first album of original material since A Secret Life (1994). This work, produced by Daniel Lanois and Mark Howard, is a balladry-like extension of her then neo-cabaret persona, interpreting songs by herself and songwriters of her generation, like Pink Floyd's Roger Waters, Leonard Cohen and the songwriting duo Elton John and Bernie Taupin. Many of the stories told on this album were adapted from memories that didn't make her autobiography or her observations of social struggles by which she felt particularly moved.

"Incarceration of a Flower Child" was written by Roger Waters in 1968, and has never been recorded in any format by Pink Floyd. The lyrics seem to be about the downfall of former Floyd member Syd Barrett, but Waters has never confirmed this.

A Deluxe Edition was released in 2022 by BMG Rights Management.

== Track listing ==
1. "Vagabond Ways" (Marianne Faithfull, David Courts) – 3:22
2. "Incarceration of a Flower Child" (Roger Waters) – 5:34
3. "File It Under Fun from the Past" (Marianne Faithfull, Barry Reynolds) – 4:50
4. "Electra" (Marianne Faithfull, Barry Reynolds, Frank McGuinness) – 3:24
5. "Wilder Shores of Love" (Marianne Faithfull, Barry Reynolds, Guy Pratt) – 5:40
6. "Marathon Kiss" (Daniel Lanois) – 4:00
7. "For Wanting You" (Elton John, Bernie Taupin) – 3:57
8. "Great Expectations" (Marianne Faithfull, Daniel Lanois) – 3:13
9. "Tower of Song" (Leonard Cohen) – 4:35
10. "After the Ceasefire" (Daniel Lanois, Frank McGuinness) – 4:22

Bonus track (Japan edition)

1. "Blood in My Eyes" (Bob Dylan) – 4:07

2022 deluxe edition extra tracks

1. "Blood in My Eyes" (bonus track)
2. "Drifting" (previously unreleased)
3. "Vagabond Ways" (Demo) (previously unreleased)
4. "Incarceration of a Flower Child" (Demo) (previously unreleased)
5. "Electra" (Demo) (previously unreleased)
6. "Tower of Song" (Demo) (previously unreleased)

== Personnel ==
- Marianne Faithfull – vocals
- Daniel Lanois – producer, guitar, bass, keyboards, drums, percussion, loops
- Barry Reynolds – guitar, slide guitar, bass, piano
- Victor Indrizzo – guitar
- Michael Chaves – guitar
- Roger Waters – bass, keyboards
- Christopher Thomas – bass, fuzz bass, double bass
- Novi Novog – viola
- Stephanie File – cello
- Mark Howard – producer, keyboards, organ, percussion, loops, mixing
- Glenn Patscha – keyboards, piano, bass pedals, string arrangements
- Brian Blade – drums, percussion
- Danny Frankel – drums, percussion
- Emmylou Harris – background vocals
- Daryl Johnson – background vocals

Technical

- Daniel Lanois – original production on "Marathon Kiss"
- Simon Francis – engineer
- Zack Allentuck – engineer
- Ellen von Unwerth – photography

== Charts ==
Chart (1999)	Peak position
French Albums (SNEP)	75
UK Albums (OCC)	86
UK Independent Albums (OCC)	47
