= 20th Century Blues (Marianne Faithfull album) =

Live album by Marianne Faithfull
- Released: 1996
- Recorded: 1996
- Venues: New Morning in Paris, France
- Studios: Extra recording at Essex Studios, London, England
- Genre: Dark cabaret
- Length: 54:04
- Label: RCA Victor
- Producer: Marianne Faithfull

Marianne Faithfull chronology
A Secret Life (1995)	20th Century Blues (1996)	The Seven Deadly Sins (1998)

Singles from 20th Century Blues
- 1. "Don't Forget Me" Released: 1996

Professional ratings
Review scores
Source	Rating
AllMusic	4/5 stars

20th Century Blues is a live 1996 album by English singer Marianne Faithfull, in collaboration with pianist Paul Trueblood.

== Track listing ==
No.	Title	Writer(s)	Length
1.	"Alabama Song"	Kurt Weill, Bertolt Brecht
2.	"Want to Buy Some Illusions"	Friedrich Holländer
3.	"Pirate Jenny"	Weill, Brecht, English translation by Frank McGuiness
4.	"Salomon Song"	Weill, Brecht, English translation by McGuiness
5.	"Boulevard of Broken Dreams"	Harry Warren, Al Dubin
6.	"Complainte de la Seine"	Kurt Weill, Maurice Magre
7.	"The Ballad of the Soldier's Wife"	Weill, Brecht
8.	"Intro"
9.	"Mon Ami (My Friend)"	Kurt Weill, Paul Green
10.	"Falling in Love Again"	Friedrich Holländer, Sammy Lerner
11.	"Mack the Knife"	Weill, Brecht, English translation by McGuiness
12.	"20th Century Blues"	Noël Coward
13.	"Don't Forget Me"	Harry Nilsson
14.	"Surabaya Johnny"	Brecht, Weill, English translation by Michael Feingold
15.	"Outro: Street Singer's Farewell"	Weill, Brecht, English translation by McGuiness

== Personnel ==
- Marianne Faithfull – vocals
- Paul Trueblood – piano
- Chuchow – acoustic bass

Technical

- Fred Defaye, Myriam Eddaïra – engineer
- Martin Böhm – mixing
- Nick Knight – photography

== Songs ==
- The "Alabama Song" is from the Brecht-Weill opera The Rise and Fall of the City of Mahagonny (1930). Faithfull would re-record the song in a year, accompanied this time by Dennis Russell Davies conducting the Vienna Radio Orchestra.
- "Illusions" was originally performed by Marlene Dietrich in the Billy Wilder film A Foreign Affair (1948).
- "Pirate Jenny" was introduced by Roma Bahn in the original Berlin production of The Threepenny Opera on 31 August 1928. Faithfull would re-record the song in a year, accompanied this time by Dennis Russell Davies conducting the Vienna Radio Orchestra.
- "Boulevard of Broken Dreams" had previously been recorded by Faithfull on her 1987 album Strange Weather.
- "Complainte de la Seine" is performed in the original French.
- Faithfull had previously recorded "The Ballad of the Soldier's Wife" on Hal Willner's Kurt Weill tribute album Lost in the Stars: The Music of Kurt Weill (1985), as a duet with guitarist Chris Spedding.
- "Mon Ami, My Friend" was first introduced by Paula Miller in the original Broadway production of Johnny Johnson, Kurt Weill's first musical written for the Broadway stage.
- "Falling in Love Again" was introduced in German as "Ich bin von Kopf bis Fuß auf Liebe eingestellt" by Marlene Dietrich in Josef von Sternberg's cinematic masterpiece Der blaue Engel (1930).
- "Mack the Knife" is the moritat from The Threepenny Opera, where it was introduced in the original Berlin production by Kurt Gerron. Faithfull performs it here in Irish playwright Frank McGuiness's English language translation (as she does all the Threepenny material on the album), as she had recently performed the role of Jenny in a staging of the McGuiness translation at the Gate Theatre in Dublin.
- Faithfull had first performed Coward's "20th Century Blues" in David Bowie's The 1980 Floor Show, recorded at London's Marquee Club in October 1974 for American television.
- "Don't Forget Me" first appeared on the Harry Nilsson-John Lennon collaboration, Pussy Cats (1974), which was produced by Lennon during his "Lost Weekend" phase.
- "Surabaya Johnny" was introduced by Carola Neher in the original Berlin production of Happy End (1929). Faithfull sings the Michael Feingold translation, which was performed on Broadway in 1977 by Meryl Streep to co-star Christopher Lloyd. Faithfull would re-record the song in a year, accompanied this time by Dennis Russell Davies conducting the Vienna Radio Orchestra.
- "Street Singers Farewell" is the Frank McGuiness translation of Brecht's final verses of the moritat which were written as the ending to G.W. Pabst's film version of Die Dreigroschenoper (1931).
