= Warren Ellis (musician) =

Australian musician and composer

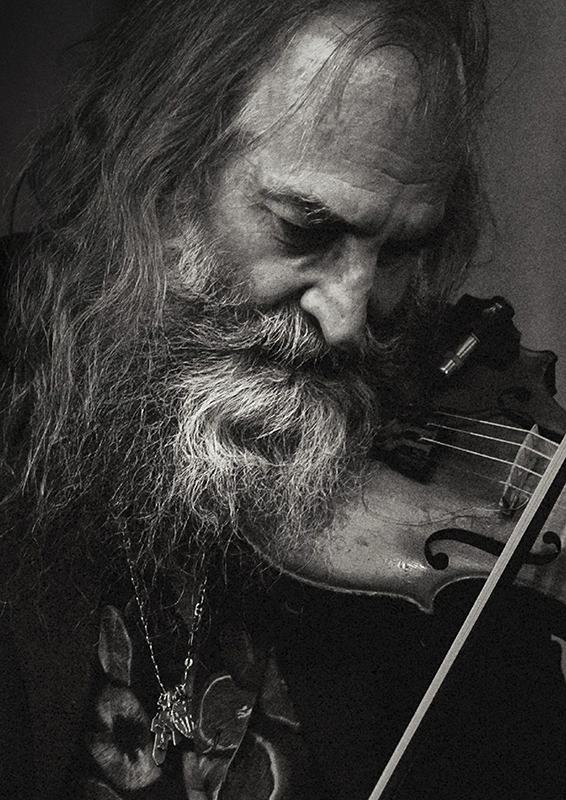
- Ellis playing violin in 2021

Background information
- Born: 14 February 1965 (age 61); Ballarat, Victoria, Australia
- Occupations: Musician; composer
- Instruments: Violin; piano; accordion; bouzouki; guitar; flute; mandolin; viola
- Labels: Anchor & Hope; Bella Union
- Member of: Dirty Three; Nick Cave and the Bad Seeds
- Formerly of: Grinderman

Warren Ellis (born 14 February 1965) is an Australian musician and composer. He is a member of the rock groups Dirty Three and Nick Cave and the Bad Seeds. He performed with the band Grinderman until its disbandment in 2013, and has composed film scores with long-time friend, collaborator and band-mate Nick Cave. Ellis plays the violin, piano, accordion, bouzouki, guitar, flute, mandolin, mandocello and viola. He has been a member of Nick Cave and the Bad Seeds since 1994.

== Life and career ==
Ellis was born in Ballarat, Victoria. He has said that he came to music by accident: while playing at the local tip, he found an abandoned piano accordion. He took it to school and his teacher showed him how to play it. He later learned classical violin and flute at school in Ballarat.

After winning a scholarship to a private high school, Ellis went to university in Melbourne, where he studied classical violin. After that he then worked briefly as a schoolteacher in country Victoria. In January 1988 he travelled to Europe, where he busked in Greece, Hungary, Scotland and Ireland. A year later he returned to Australia. Ellis then wrote music for theatre groups and performed at art openings and plays in Melbourne, before he started playing in bands in the early nineties.

In 1992, Ellis formed The Dirty Three with guitarist Mick Turner and drummer Jim White. As of 2018 the band has recorded nine studio albums, including several to appear on the ARIA charts in their native Australia.

In 1993, Ellis was invited to play with Nick Cave and the Bad Seeds as part of a small string ensemble for several songs on Let Love In (released 1994). He soon joined the band as a full-time member, initially emphasizing violin but gradually adding many other instruments. Ellis eventually co-wrote many of the band's songs and became a pivotal collaborator with singer Nick Cave in film scores and other projects. Ellis was also a member of Grinderman, a side-group from the Bad Seeds, who have released two albums.

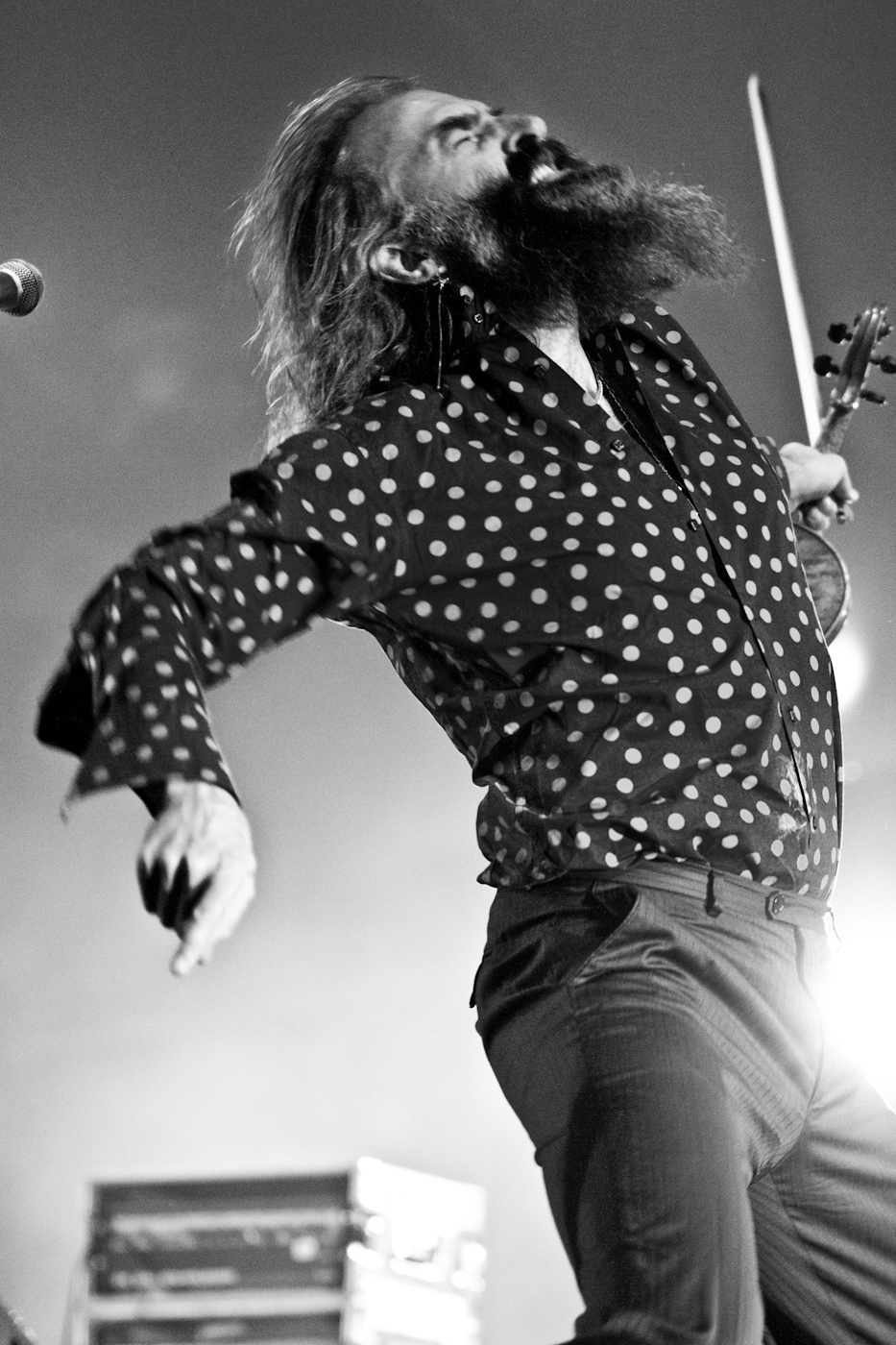
Ellis of the Dirty Three performing at WOMADelaide 2012

In 2002, Ellis released a solo album on King Crab records called Three Pieces for Violin. Since 2005 he has played on several Marianne Faithfull albums. Nick Cave and Warren Ellis composed the award-winning score of the film The Proposition, and collaborated again on the scores of The Assassination of Jesse James by the Coward Robert Ford, The Road, and Far from Men.

In 2009, Nick Cave and Warren Ellis released White Lunar – an album that includes other soundtrack scores.

Following the release of Carnage, Ellis and Nick Cave toured Europe in the autumn of 2021 and the United States in the spring of 2022.

Ellis has lived in Paris since 1998 with his French wife and their two children.

In 2021, Ellis and his wife announced the purchase of a parcel of land in Sumatra, which they donated to the non-profit Jakarta Animal Aid Network. Ellis Park Wildlife Sanctuary is adjacent to the existing Sumatra Wildlife Centre, and specialises in animals who need lifetime care and cannot survive in the wild. Ellis Park, a documentary about Ellis and the Sanctuary, was directed by Justin Kurzel.

== Works ==
=== Solo albums ===
- Three Pieces for Violin (2002)

=== Solo scores ===
- Mustang, film soundtrack (2015)
- Bad Girl, film soundtrack (2017)
- Django, film soundtrack (2017)
- This Train I Ride, film soundtrack (2020)
- Purple Perilla, book soundtrack (2021)
- I'm Still Here, film soundtrack (2024)

=== Collaborations with Nick Cave ===
- Woyzeck, theatre score (2005), adaptation by Gísli Örn Gardarsson
- The Proposition, soundtrack (2005)
- The Metamorphosis, theatre score (2006)
- The Assassination of Jesse James by the Coward Robert Ford, soundtrack (2007)
- The English Surgeon, soundtrack (2007) with Nick Cave
- The Road, soundtrack (2009)
- The Girls of Phnom Penh, soundtrack (2009)
- Lawless soundtrack (2012) composed with Nick Cave
- Days of Grace, soundtrack (2012) With Nick Cave, Atticus Ross, Claudia Sarne, Leopold Ross & Shigeru Umebayashi
- West of Memphis, soundtrack (2013)
- Loin des Hommes, soundtrack (2015)
- Hell or High Water, soundtrack (2016) composed with Nick Cave
- War Machine, soundtrack (2017) composed with Nick Cave
- Wind River, soundtrack (2017) composed with Nick Cave
- Kings, soundtrack (2017) composed with Nick Cave
- Carnage, studio album (2021)
- La Panthère Des Neiges, soundtrack (2021)
- Blonde, soundtrack (2022) composed with Nick Cave
- Dahmer – Monster: The Jeffrey Dahmer Story, soundtrack (2022) composed with Nick Cave
- "Wood Dove", a track for the "For the Birds: The Birdsong Project", Vol. 2.
- Back to Black, soundtrack (2024) composed with Nick Cave
- Harry Hole (original music) (2025) with Nick Cave

=== Other collaborations ===
- These Future Kings' 'Bury My Bones' single (1987)
- The Blackeyed Susans' album All Souls Alive (1993)
- Kim Salmon's album Hey Believer (1994)
- David McComb's album Love of Will (1994)
- Played live music for Chicago neo-burlesque performer Maya Sinstress in 2000
- Cat Power's album You Are Free (violin on "Good Woman") (2003)
- Loene Carmen's album Slight Delay (2004)
- "Crazy Love" by Marianne Faithfull/Nick Cave, with Isabelle Huppert on Before the Poison (2005)
- "Hell's Coming Down" from Primal Scream's album Riot City Blues (2006)
- Theo Hakola's album Drunk Women and Sexual Water (2008)
- Jim Yamouridis' album Into the Day (2011)
- The songs "Woman, When I've Raised Hell" and "Honeymoon's Great! Wish You Were Her" on the album Last of the Country Gentlemen by Josh T. Pearson (2011)
- "Pirate Jenny" with Shilpa Ray and Nick Cave on Son of Rogues Gallery: Pirate Ballads, Sea Songs & Chanteys (2013)
- Marianne Faithfull's album Give My Love to London (2014)
- "Stepkids" from The Avalanches' album Wildflower (2016)
- "A Common Truth" by Saltland (Rebecca Foon) (2017)
- "Le Brasier Shelley" with Augustin Viard, audio cinema film featuring Marianne Faithfull and Gaspard Ulliel, France Culture (2018)
- Five tracks on Amadjar by Tinariwen
- Co-credit with Marianne Faithfull – She Walks in Beauty (2021)
- "About You" from The 1975's album "Being Funny in a Foreign Language" (2022)

=== Books ===
- Nina Simone's Gum (2022, Faber & Faber; ISBN 9780571365630)

== Awards and nominations ==
- 2005 AFI Awards: Best Original Music Score (The Proposition)
- 2005 Inside Film Awards: Best Music (The Proposition)
- 2005 Film Critics Circle of Australia Awards: Best Musical Score (The Proposition)
- 2010 Kermode Awards: Best Score (The Road)
- 2016 César Award for Best Original Music: Best Original Music Score (Mustang)

APRA Music Awards

The APRA Awards have been presented annually since 1982 by the Australasian Performing Right Association (APRA), "honouring composers and songwriters".

Year	Nominee / work	Award	Result	Ref.
2014	"Jubilee Street" (with Nick Cave)	Song of the Year	Shortlisted	
2014	"We No Who U R" (with Nick Cave)	Song of the Year	Shortlisted	
2021	"Ghosteen" (with Nick Cave)	Song of the Year	Shortlisted	
2022	"Albuquerque" (with Nick Cave)	Song of the Year	Shortlisted	
2025	"Wild God" (with Nick Cave)	Song of the Year	Shortlisted	

ARIA Music Awards

The ARIA Music Awards is an annual ceremony presented by Australian Recording Industry Association (ARIA), which recognise excellence, innovation, and achievement across all genres of the music of Australia. They commenced in 1987.

Year	Nominee / work	Award	Result
2006	The Proposition (Nick Cave with Warren Ellis)	Best Original Soundtrack / Cast / Show Recording	Nominated
2007	Nick Cave (honorary inductees Harvey, Ellis, Savage, Casey)	ARIA Hall of Fame	inducted
2013	Lawless (with Nick Cave)	Best Original Soundtrack / Cast / Show Recording	Nominated
2021	Carnage (with Nick Cave)	Best Adult Contemporary Album	Nominated

Australian Music Prize

The Australian Music Prize (the AMP) is an annual award of $30,000 given to an Australian band or solo artist in recognition of the merit of an album released during the year of award. It commenced in 2005.

Year	Nominee / work	Award	Result
2021	Carnage (with Nick Cave)	Australian Music Prize	Nominated

National Live Music Awards

The National Live Music Awards (NLMAs) are a broad recognition of Australia's diverse live industry, celebrating the success of the Australian live scene. The awards commenced in 2016.

Year	Nominee / work	Award	Result
2020	himself	Live Instrumentalist of the Year	Won
2023	Nick Cave and Warren Ellis - Australian Carnage Tour (Supersonic)	Best International Tour in Australia	Won
