= September Songs – The Music of Kurt Weill =

- Directed by: Larry Weinstein
- Written by: Larry Weinstein, David Mortin
- Produced by: Larry Weinstein
- Cinematography: Horst Zeidler
- Edited by: David New
- Music by: Kurt Weill
- Distributed by: Sheena MacDonald, Rhombus International
- Release date: 1994
- Running time: 1 hour, 25 minutes
- Countries: Canada, Germany, Portugal
- Languages: English, German, French

September Songs – The Music of Kurt Weill is a music video of 94 minutes recorded in 1994 for Rhombus Media, ZDF (Germany), CBC (Canada) and RTP (Portugal). It was produced and directed by Larry Weinstein, and written by Weinstein and David Mortin. The film was conceived as a follow-up to the album Lost in the Stars: The Music of Kurt Weill whose producer Hal Willner served as the music supervisor in this project. The film was nominated for the 1995 Emmy Awards for Outstanding Cultural Program; it won five Gemini Awards in 1997. An album was released in 1997.

== Background ==
Larry Weinstein was inspired to film September Songs after he heard Lost in the Stars: The Music of Kurt Weill. The producer of Lost in the Stars Hal Willner was engaged to supervise the recording. The backdrop of the performance consists of an abandoned warehouse in Toronto where musicians perform a series of songs by Kurt Weill. Between songs, parts of Weill's biography are narrated.

The cast of consists of the Brodsky Quartet, William S. Burroughs, Betty Carter, Nick Cave and Spanish Fly, Elvis Costello, Kathy Dalton, Bob Dorough, Charlie Haden, PJ Harvey, David Johansen, Lou Reed, Mary Margaret O'Hara, The Persuasions, Stan Ridgway, Ralph Schuckett, Ellen Shipley, Teresa Stratas, the Brodsky Quartet, the Y Chamber Symphony. It also features the voices of Lotte Lenya, Bertolt Brecht, and Weill.

Two artists reprised their performances from Lost in the Stars: The Music of Kurt Weill: Lou Reed recorded a second version of "September Song", and Charlie Haden re-recorded "Speak Low" with new arrangement by Fred Hersch and archived voice of Kurt Weill singing the song added. Betty Carter was originally slated to appear in the first album, but scheduling issues precluded her inclusion. Here she performed "Lonely House", a song which she also added to her album I'm Yours, You're Mine. Elvis Costello and Brodsky Quartet were asked to record "Lost in the Stars" as Willner had seen them performing the song as an encore while on tour.

The original video recording was released in 1994 and was shown as part of Great Performances on PBS. An album was released in 1997; many of the performances in the album were recorded live in Toronto, but some were recorded elsewhere. Although Teresa Stratas performed the two songs in the film, "Youkali Tango" and "Surabaya Johnny" were licensed for inclusion in this album from her own albums but with a little accordion added to "Youkali Tango". Also included in the album are two historical performances: a 1955 recording of Weill's wife Lotte Lenya singing "Pirate Jenny", and a 1930 recording of Bertolt Brecht reciting "Mack the Knife". However, no single could be released from the album due to licensing issues.

== Track list ==
The order of songs is taken from the Sony Classical CD. The order in the film is different and there are more songs in the film: Kathy Dalton sings "Aggie's Sewing Machine" ("Aggie's Song") from Johnny Johnson, Stan Ridgway sings the "Cannon Song" from The Three Penny Opera with Tom and Bruce Fowler and a choreography by Janice Hladki, Ghettoriginal Dance Company performs "Mandalay-B-Boy-Parlay" inspired by the "Mandalay Song" from Happy End. The film also features the Esprit Orchestra playing the "Nocturne" and "Weill Variations" (by Alex Pauk) from Weill's incidental music for the play Konjunktur by Léo Lania and the instrumental "Song of the Goddess" from Johnny Johnson played by the MGM Studio Orchestra.

All music is composed by Kurt Weill.

No.	Title	Lyrics	Performer(s)	Length
1.	"Mack the Knife" (from The Threepenny Opera)	Bertolt Brecht, Marc Blitzstein	Nick Cave, Spanish Fly	4:53
2.	"Ballad of the Soldier's Wife"	Bertolt Brecht, Eric Saltzman	PJ Harvey	4:26
3.	"Alabama Song" (from Mahagonny-Songspiel)	Bertolt Brecht	David Johansen / Ellen Shipley / Ralph Schuckett / Bob Dorough	4:32
4.	"Youkali Tango" (from Marie Galante)	Roger Fernay	Teresa Stratas (voice), Joseph Macerollo (accordion), choreography: Ginette Laurin, dancers: Vertigo	6:39
5.	"Lost in the Stars" (from Lost in the Stars)	Maxwell Anderson	Elvis Costello, Brodsky Quartet	3:56
6.	"Pirate Jenny" (from The Threepenny Opera)	Bertolt Brecht	Lotte Lenya	4:04
7.	"Speak Low" (from One Touch of Venus)	Ogden Nash	Charlie Haden (double bass), Kurt Weill (voice)	5:31
8.	"Oh, Heavenly Salvation"	Bertolt Brecht / Arnold Weinstein	The Persuasions	3:36
9.	"Lonely House" (from Street Scene)	Langston Hughes	Betty Carter	7:32
10.	"Surabaya Johnny" (from Happy End)	Bertolt Brecht	Teresa Stratas, Gerard Schwarz, Y Chamber Symphony	5:58
11.	"Fürchte dich nicht" (from Happy End)	Bertold Brecht, Michael Feingold	Mary Margaret O'Hara	4:25
12.	"September Song" (from Knickerbocker Holiday)	Maxwell Anderson	Lou Reed	7:51
13.	"Mack the Knife" (from The Threepenny Opera)	Bertolt Brecht	Bertolt Brecht	2:48
14.	"What Keeps Mankind Alive?" (from The Threepenny Opera)	Bertolt Brecht, John Willett, Ralph Manheim	William S. Burroughs, Anthony Coleman & Selfhaters Orchestra	2:46
