= Berlin to Broadway with Kurt Weill =

- A Musical Voyage
- Original Cast Album
- Music: Kurt Weill
- Lyrics: Various
- Book: Gene Lerner
- Basis: Life and music of Kurt Weill
- Productions: 1972 Off-Broadway; 2000 Off-Broadway revival

Berlin to Broadway with Kurt Weill is a musical revue with a book by Gene Lerner, music by Kurt Weill, and lyrics by various songwriting partners Weill worked with over his career. The plot follows Weill's life as he begins his career in Germany writing the music for controversial musicals, through his journey fleeing Nazi persecution, immigrating to the United States, and becoming successful on Broadway. Songs featured include those Weill collaborated on with Maxwell Anderson, Marc Blitzstein, Bertolt Brecht, Jacques Deval, Michael Feingold, Ira Gershwin, Paul Green, Langston Hughes, Alan Jay Lerner, Ogden Nash, George Tabori and Arnold Weinstein.

== Song list ==
The Threepenny Opera (medley)

- How to Survive
- Barbara Song
- Jealousy Duet
- Useless Song (reprise)
- Mack the Knife (Moritat)
- How to Survive (reprise)

Happy End (medley)

- March Ahead to the Fight
- Don't Be Afraid
- Bilbao Song
- Surabaya Johnny
- Childhood's Bright Endeavor
- Mandalay Song

Rise and Fall of the City of Mahagonny (medley)

- Alabama Song
- Deep in Alaska
- Oh, Heavenly Salvation
- As You Make Your Bed

Pirate Jenny (from The Threepenny Opera)

I Wait For a Ship (from Marie Galante)

Sailor Tango (Happy End)

Johnny Johnson (medley)

- Songs of War and Peace
- A Hymn to Peace
- Listen to My Song (Johnny's Song)

Knickerbocker Holiday (medley)

- How Can You Tell an American
- September Song

Lady in the Dark (medley)

- Girl of the Moment
- Saga of Jenny
- My Ship

One Touch of Venus (medley)

- Speak Low
- That's Him

Progress (from Love Life)

Street Scene (medley)

- Ain't It Awful the Heat?
- Lonely House

Lost in the Stars (medley)

- Trouble Man
- Train to Johannesburg
- Cry, the Beloved Country
- Lost in the Stars

Love Song (from Love Life)

Moritat (Reprise)

== Productions ==
The revue premiered off-Broadway on October 1, 1972, at the Theater de Lys, starring Margery Cohen, Ken Kercheval, Judy Lander, Jerry Lanning, and Hal Watters. Eileen Barett and Hal Robinson were the understudies. It was directed by Donald Saddler, conducted by Newton Wayland, with William Glenn operating the follow spots and ran for 152 performances before closing on February 11, 1973. When the show premiered, Christopher Street was renamed "Kurt Weill-Strauss" for an hour to honor Weill's legacy and lasting impact on off-Broadway theatre.

The first off-Broadway revival opened August 19, 2000 at the Triad Theatre and closed on December 3, 2000, after 121 performances. Hal Simmons directed, with Eric Stern as musical director, and the cast included Lorinda Lisitza, Bjorn Olsson, Veronica Mittenzwei and Michael Winther.
