= What Keeps Mankind Alive? =

Song
- Published: 1928
- Songwriter: Bertolt Brecht
- Composer: Kurt Weill

"What Keeps Mankind Alive?" is a song composed by Kurt Weill with lyrics by Bertolt Brecht for their "play with music" (Stück mit Musik) The Threepenny Opera (Die Dreigroschenoper) which premiered in Berlin in 1928 at the Theater am Schiffbauerdamm. The title refers to the central line from the finale of act 2, Denn wovon lebt der Mensch?. In the play, the two stanzas of the strophic piece are sung by Macheath and Mrs Peachum (Jenny in some productions) and the final line is sung in fortissimo by the chorus.

== Theme ==
It is an agitprop socialist anthem expressing that the comfortable lifestyle enjoyed by the rich is paid for by the suffering of the masses. The lyrics begin (in the John Willett / Ralph Manheim translation): "You gentlemen who think you have a mission / To purge us from the seven deadly sins / Should first sort out the basic food position / Then start your preaching, that's where it begins." The song ends with the conclusion, "For once you must not try to shirk the facts / Mankind is kept alive by bestial acts."

== Text ==
Macheath:
Ihr Herrn, die ihr uns lehrt, wie man brav leben
und Sünd und Missetat vermeiden kann.
Zuerst müßt ihr uns was zu fressen geben,
dann könnt ihr reden: damit fängt es an.
Ihr, die ihr euren Wanst und unsre Bravheit liebt,
das eine wisset ein für allemal:
Wie ihr es immer dreht und wie ihr's immer schiebt,
erst kommt das Fressen, dann kommt die Moral.
Erst muss es möglich sein auch armen Leuten,
Vom großen Brotlaib sich ihr Teil zu schneiden.

Refrain:
(Stimme hinter der Szene, laut gerufen)
Denn wovon lebt der Mensch?
Macheath und Frau Peachum:
Denn wovon lebt der Mensch? Indem er stündlich
den Menschen peinigt, auszieht, anfällt, abwürgt und frisst.
Nur dadurch lebt der Mensch, dass er so gründlich
vergessen kann, dass er ein Mensch doch ist.

Chor:
Ihr Herren, bildet euch nur da nichts ein:
Der Mensch lebt nur von Missetat allein!

Frau Peachum:
Ihr lehrt uns, wann ein Weib die Röcke heben
und ihre Augen einwärts drehen kann.
Zuerst müßt ihr uns was zu fressen geben,
dann könnt ihr reden: damit fängt es an.
Ihr, die auf unsrer Scham und eurer Lust besteht,
das eine wisset ein für allemal:
Wie ihr es immer schiebt und wie ihr's immer dreht,
erst kommt das Fressen, dann kommt die Moral.
Erst muss es möglich sein auch armen Leuten,
vom großen Brotlaib sich ihr Teil zu schneiden.

Refrain

Macheath:
You gentlemen who think you have a mission
to purge us of the seven deadly sins,
should first sort out the basic food position,
then start your preaching! That's where it begins.
You lot who preach restraint and watch your waist as well,
should learn, for once, the way the world is run:
However much you twist, whatever lies you tell,
food is the first thing, morals follow on.
So first make sure that those who now are starving
get proper helpings when we all start carving.

Refrain:
(Voice off-stage, shouted loudly)
What keeps mankind alive?
Macheath and Mrs Peachum:
What keeps mankind alive? The fact that millions
are daily tortured, stifled, punished, silenced, oppressed.
Mankind can keep alive thanks to its brilliance
in keeping its humanity repressed.

Chorus:
For once you must try not to shirk the facts:
Mankind is kept alive by bestial acts.

Mrs. Peachum:
You say that girls may strip with your permission.
You draw the line dividing art from sin.
So first sort out the basic food position,
then start your preaching! That's where we begin.
You lot who bank on your desires and our disgust
Should learn for once the way the world is run:
Whatever lies you tell, however much you twist,
food is the first thing, morals follow on.
So first make sure that those who are now starving
get proper helpings when we all start carving.

Refrain

== Covers ==
The English translations by Marc Blitzstein, Willett/Manheim, and Michael Feingold, have been covered by Tom Waits (on the 1985 album Lost in the Stars: The Music of Kurt Weill, and included on the 2006 Waits compilation Orphans: Brawlers, Bawlers & Bastards); the Pet Shop Boys (as a B-side on the single "Can You Forgive Her?", included on their 1995 compilation album Alternative); William S. Burroughs (in the 1994 documentary September Songs – The Music of Kurt Weill); and others. The opening chapter in The League of Extraordinary Gentlemen, Volume III: Century is named "What Keeps Mankind Alive?", repurposes elements of The Threepenny Opera, and ends with a new translation of the song by Alan Moore.
