= Steve Weisberg =

American composer, pianist, recording artist, and producer

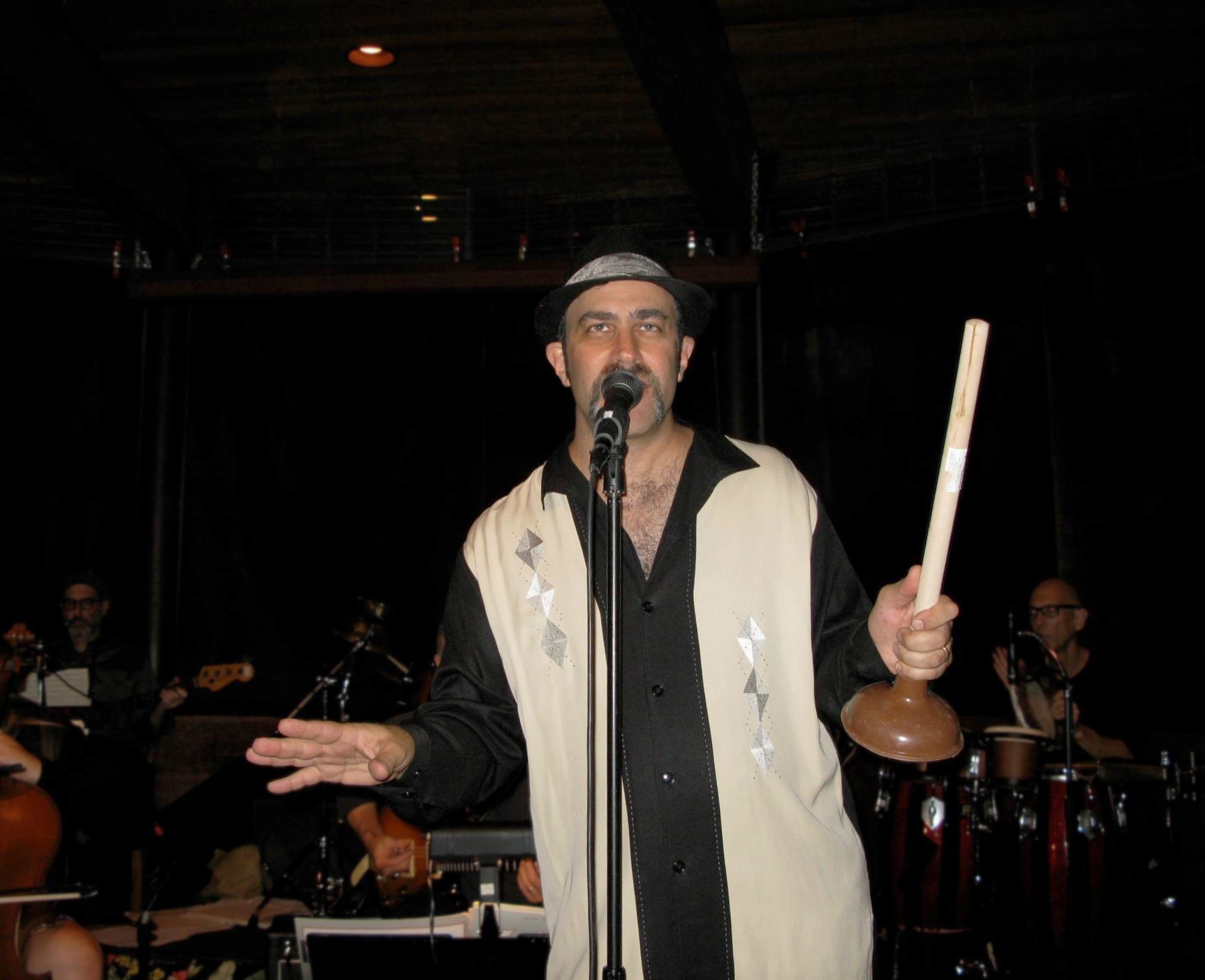

Background information
- Born: 1963 (age 62–63); Norfolk, Virginia, United States
- Genres: Jazz, pop, rock
- Occupations: Composer, pianist, recording artist, and producer
- Instruments: Guitar, drums
- Years active: 1970s–present
- Website: www.sworchestra.com

Steve Weisberg (born 1963 in Norfolk, Virginia, United States) is an American composer, pianist, recording artist, and producer. In the 1980s, after studying with Michael Gibbs at Berklee College in Boston, Massachusetts, he recorded the XtraWatt/ECM release "I Can't Stand Another Night Alone (In Bed With You)," produced by Carla Bley and Steve Swallow, recorded and performed with Karen Mantler and her Cat Arnold, and contributed arrangements for Hal Willner's Lost in the Stars: The Music of Kurt Weill (A&M).

Weisberg re-emerged in 2002 to arrange for Hal Willner's Stormy Weather: The Music of Harold Arlen (Sony).

In 2006, he produced A Portrait of Howard by 60's soul legend Howard Tate, which features Lou Reed, Carla Bley, Larry Goldings, Pete Thomas, and Davey Faragher, along with a 20-piece orchestra.
