= Lost in the Stars: The Music of Kurt Weill =

Compilation album by Hal Willner
- Released: October 1985
- Length: 60:08
- Label: A&M
- Producer: Hal Willner, Paul M. Young

Hal Willner chronology
That's The Way I Feel Now: A Tribute to Thelonious Monk (1984)	Lost in the Stars: The Music of Kurt Weill (1985)	Stay Awake: Interpretations of Vintage Disney Films (1988)

Professional ratings
Review scores
Source	Rating
AllMusic	4.5/5 stars
The Village Voice	A

Lost in the Stars: The Music of Kurt Weill is a 1985 tribute album to German-American composer Kurt Weill. It was executive-produced by Hal Willner and John Telfer, and produced by Hal Willner and Paul M. Young.

== Track listing ==
=== Original release ===
No.	Title	Artist	Length
1.	"Introduction" (from Mahagonny-Songspiel)	Steve Weisberg	0:48
2.	"The Ballad of Mack The Knife" (from The Threepenny Opera)	Sting and Dominic Muldowney	2:43
3.	"The Cannon Song" (from The Threepenny Opera)	The Fowler Brothers and Stan Ridgway	2:17
4.	"Ballad of the Soldier's Wife"	Marianne Faithfull and Chris Spedding	4:21
5.	"Johnny Johnson Medley": 1. "Overture"; 2. "Johnny's Melody"; 3. "Aggie's Sewing Machine"	Van Dyke Parks	5:44
6.	"Alabama Song" (from Rise and Fall of the City of Mahagonny)	Ralph Schuckett with Richard Butler	4:24
7.	"Youkali Tango"	Armadillo String Quartet	4:39
8.	"Der Kleine Leutnant Des Lieben Gottes" ("The Little Lieutenant of the Loving God" from Happy End)	John Zorn	5:22
9.	"September Song" (from Knickerbocker Holiday)	Lou Reed	4:15
10.	"Lost in the Stars"	Carla Bley with Phil Woods	6:10
11.	"What Keeps Mankind Alive?" (from The Threepenny Opera)	Tom Waits	2:10
12.	"Surabaya Johnny" (from Happy End)	Dagmar Krause	4:07
13.	"Oh Heavenly Salvation" (from Mahagonny)	Mark Bingham with Johnny Adams and Aaron Neville	2:34
14.	"Call From The Grave/Ballad In Which MacHeath Begs All Men For Forgiveness" (from The Threepenny Opera)	Todd Rundgren with Gary Windo	5:21
15.	"Speak Low" (from One Touch of Venus)	Charlie Haden and Sharon Freeman	4:22
16.	"In No Man's Land" (from Johnny Johnson)	Van Dyke Parks	0:51
Total length:			60:08

=== CD re-release ===
No.	Title	Artist	Length
1.	"Introduction" (from Mahagonny-Songspiel)	Steve Weisberg	0:48
2.	"The Ballad of Mack The Knife" (from The Threepenny Opera)	Sting and Dominic Muldowney	2:43
3.	"The Cannon Song" (from The Threepenny Opera)	The Fowler Brothers and Stan Ridgway	2:17
4.	"Ballad of the Soldier's Wife"	Marianne Faithfull and Chris Spedding	4:21
5.	"Johnny Johnson Medley": 1. "Overture"; 2. "Johnny's Melody"; 3. "Aggie's Sewing Machine"	Van Dyke Parks	5:44
6.	"The Great Hall"	Henry Threadgill	3:38
7.	"Alabama Song" (from Rise and Fall of the City of Mahagonny)	Ralph Schuckett with Richard Butler	4:24
8.	"Youkali Tango"	Armadillo String Quartet	4:39
9.	"Der Kleine Leutnant Des Lieben Gottes" ("The Little Lieutenant of the Loving God" from Happy End)	John Zorn	5:22
10.	"Johnny's Speech"	Van Dyke Parks	1:44
11.	"September Song" (from Knickerbocker Holiday)	Lou Reed	4:15
12.	"Lost in the Stars"	Carla Bley with Phil Woods	6:10
13.	"What Keeps Mankind Alive?" (from The Threepenny Opera)	Tom Waits	2:10
14.	"Klops Lied" ((Meatball Song))	Elliott Sharp	0:48
15.	"Surabaya Johnny" (from Happy End)	Dagmar Krause	4:07
16.	"Hurricane Introduction"	Mark Bingham	1:00
17.	"Oh Heavenly Salvation" (from Mahagonny)	Mark Bingham with Johnny Adams and Aaron Neville	2:34
18.	"Call From The Grave/Ballad In Which MacHeath Begs All Men For Forgiveness" (from The Threepenny Opera)	Todd Rundgren with Gary Windo	5:21
19.	"Speak Low" (from One Touch of Venus)	Charlie Haden and Sharon Freeman	4:22
20.	"In No Man's Land" (from Johnny Johnson)	Van Dyke Parks	0:51
Total length:			67:18

The CD re-release contains these additional tracks:

1. "The Great Hall" – Henry Threadgill
2. "Johnny's Speech" – Van Dyke Parks
3. "Klops Lied" (Meatball Song) – Elliott Sharp
4. "Hurricane Introduction" – Mark Bingham
