= Und was bekam des Soldaten Weib? =

1942 poem by Bertolt Brecht

"Und was bekam des Soldaten Weib?" (transl. And what did the soldier's wife receive?) is a 1942 poem by German writer Bertolt Brecht. It may be best known in its musical setting by German-born American composer Kurt Weill, Brecht's long-time musical collaborator, and in an English translation entitled "The Ballad of the Soldier's Wife" associated with that. There have been several other musical settings, as described below in their order of composition. (Note: Care must be taken with uploads to YouTube and suchlike sites. Some carry an incorrect German title for that setting and/or are attributed to the wrong composer.)

The title is also the first line of every verse. The poem relates how a German soldier of World War II sent his wife luxury items of clothing from the European capitals Prague, Oslo, Amsterdam, Brussels, Paris and Bucharest; but from Russia she got a widow's veil. (Note: A literal English translation (in copyright for the foreseeable future) by Kim H. Kowalke is included in the liner notes of the 1981 album The Unknown Kurt Weill.) Germany had invaded and occupied Czechoslovakia, Norway, Netherlands, Belgium and France (and also Austria, Poland, Luxembourg and Denmark), and was allied with Romania; but the invasion of the Soviet Union was failing.

Brecht sent the poem to Weill with a letter dated 12 March 1942, in which he said that he intended it for anti-Nazi propaganda radio broadcasts into Germany, and invited him to set it to music.

At the beginning of 1943, the BBC German Service broadcast a musical setting by Russian-born composer Mischa Spoliansky, performed by German singer and actress Lucie Mannheim and (presumably) Spoliansky on piano. Both were in exile in England at the time. It was broadcast again in January 1944, and a recording survives. A later manuscript version was rediscovered in 1998, and published the following year.

Weill intended his setting of the poem as a propaganda song. It was premiered on 3 April 1943, by Austrian-American singer, diseuse, and actress, his wife, Lotte Lenya and himself at the piano, during a fundraising concert at Hunter College, New York City, organised by German exiles Manfred George and Ernst Josef Aufricht. After the Japanese attack on Pearl Harbor in December 1941, Weill had offered his services for the war effort to the shortwave division of the CBS radio network. Now, he offered this song to the U.S. government, and that offer was taken up by the Office of War Information. The couple recorded it in spring 1944 (the recording survives), and it was broadcast by shortwave radio into Germany during the build-up to the Allied landings in Normandy in June 1944 The song remained unpublished, and was largely forgotten, until it was revived by Teresa Stratas and Richard Woitach on the 1981 album The Unknown Kurt Weill.

The best-known English translation of Weill's setting appears to be that entitled "The Ballad of the Soldier's Wife" by Eric Salzman. It has been recorded/ by musicians including Marianne Faithfull (on the 1995 album Lost in the Stars: The Music of Kurt Weill and on the 1996 album 20th Century Blues), PJ Harvey (on the 1997 album September Songs – The Music of Kurt Weill), and Elliott Murphy and Iain Matthews (on the 2001 album La terre commune).

In 1948, German composer Boris Blacher made a musical setting of the poem for a 50th birthday celebration of Brecht at the Deutsches Theater Berlin, in what was then East Germany. It was performed by German singer Kate Kühl, who had been associated with Brecht and Weill since 1928.

German composer Paul Dessau, who worked with Brecht, included a setting of the poem in his 1950 collection 20 Lieder (transl. 20 songs).

Brecht included a variant of the poem in his 1943 play Schweik in the Second World War (Schweyk im Zweiten Weltkrieg) under the title "Das Lied vom Weib des Nazisoldaten" (transl. The song of the Nazi soldier's wife). It differs in that the soldier sends his wife gifts from the cities of Prague, Warsaw, Oslo, Rotterdam, Brussels, Paris and Tripoli (in Libya). German-Austrian composer Hanns Eisler set that variant to music for the 1957 premiere of the play, in Warsaw.

A musical setting in English of a shortened version of that variant is included on Martin Carthy's 1967 album Byker Hill under the title "Wife of the Soldier". Carthy had heard it recited in English by Isla Cameron with music by flutist-saxophonist Johnny Scott. After Carthy's return to Steeleye Span, that band included it on their 1977 album Storm Force Ten.

German folk band Fiedel Michel included a version of "Und was bekam des Soldaten Weib?" on their 1980 album Fiedel Michel.

German musicologist Nils Grosch has published detailed analyses of the various settings and performances.
