= Kurt Weill =

German composer (1900–1950)

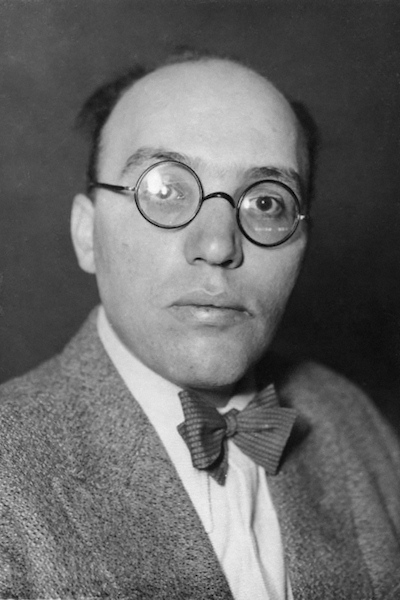
- Born: 2 March 1900; Dessau, Saxony
- Died: 3 April 1950 (aged 50); New York City, U.S.
- Occupation: Composer
- Spouse: Lotte Lenya

Kurt Julian Weill (/waɪl/; German: [vaɪl]; March 2, 1900 – April 3, 1950) was a German-born American composer (Note: In 1947 Weill explicitly disavowed Life magazine's characterization of him as "a German composer", writing in a letter to Life: "Although I was born in Germany I do not consider myself a 'German composer'.... I am an American citizen and during my dozen years in this country have composed exclusively for the American stage.... I would appreciate your straightening out your readers on this matter.") active from the 1920s in his native country, and in his later years in the United States. He was a leading composer for the stage who was best known for his fruitful collaborations with Bertolt Brecht. With Brecht, he wrote his best-known work, The Threepenny Opera, which includes the ballad "Mack the Knife". Weill held the ideal of writing music that served a socially useful purpose, Gebrauchsmusik. He also wrote several works for the concert hall and a number of works on Jewish themes. He fled Nazi Germany in 1933, arriving in the United States two years later. Settling in New York, he made a substantial contribution to American musical theater through works such as Lady in the Dark and Street Scene.

== Family and childhood ==
Weill was born on March 2, 1900, the third of four children to Albert Weill and Emma Weill (née Ackermann). He grew up in a religious Jewish family in the "Sandvorstadt", the Jewish quarter in Dessau in Saxony (now part of Saxony-Anhalt), where his father was a cantor. At the age of twelve, Weill started taking piano lessons and made his first attempts at writing music; his earliest preserved composition was written in 1913 and is titled "Mi Addir: Jewish Wedding Song".

In 1915, Weill started taking private lessons with Albert Bing, kapellmeister at the "Herzogliches Hoftheater zu Dessau", who taught him piano, composition, music theory, and conducting. Weill performed publicly on piano for the first time in 1915, both as an accompanist and soloist. The following years he composed numerous lieder to the lyrics of poets such as Joseph von Eichendorff, Arno Holz, and Anna Ritter, as well as a cycle of five songs titled Ofrahs Lieder to a German translation of a text by Yehuda Halevi.

Weill graduated with an Abitur from the Oberrealschule of Dessau in 1918, and enrolled at the Berliner Hochschule für Musik at the age of 18, where he studied composition with Engelbert Humperdinck, conducting with Rudolf Krasselt, and counterpoint with Friedrich E. Koch, and also attended philosophy lectures by Max Dessoir and Ernst Cassirer. The same year, he wrote his first string quartet (in B minor).

== Musical career ==
=== Early work and compositions ===
Weill's family experienced financial hardship in the aftermath of World War I, and in July 1919, Weill abandoned his studies and returned to Dessau, where he was employed as a répétiteur at the Friedrich-Theater under the direction of the new Kapellmeister, Hans Knappertsbusch. During this time, he composed an orchestral suite in E-flat major, a symphonic poem on Rainer Maria Rilke's The Lay of the Love and Death of Cornet Christopher Rilke, and Schilflieder ("Reed Songs"), a cycle of five songs to poems by Nikolaus Lenau. In December 1919, through the help of Humperdinck, Weill was appointed as Kapellmeister at the newly founded Stadttheater in Lüdenscheid, where he directed opera, operetta, and singspiel for five months. He subsequently composed a cello sonata and Ninon de Lenclos, a now lost one-act operatic adaptation of a 1905 play by Ernst Hardt. From May to September 1920, Weill spent a few months in Leipzig, where his father had become the director of a Jewish orphanage, residing in the Gottschedstrasse. Before he returned to Berlin, in September 1920, he composed Sulamith, a choral fantasy for soprano, female choir, and orchestra.

=== Studies with Busoni ===
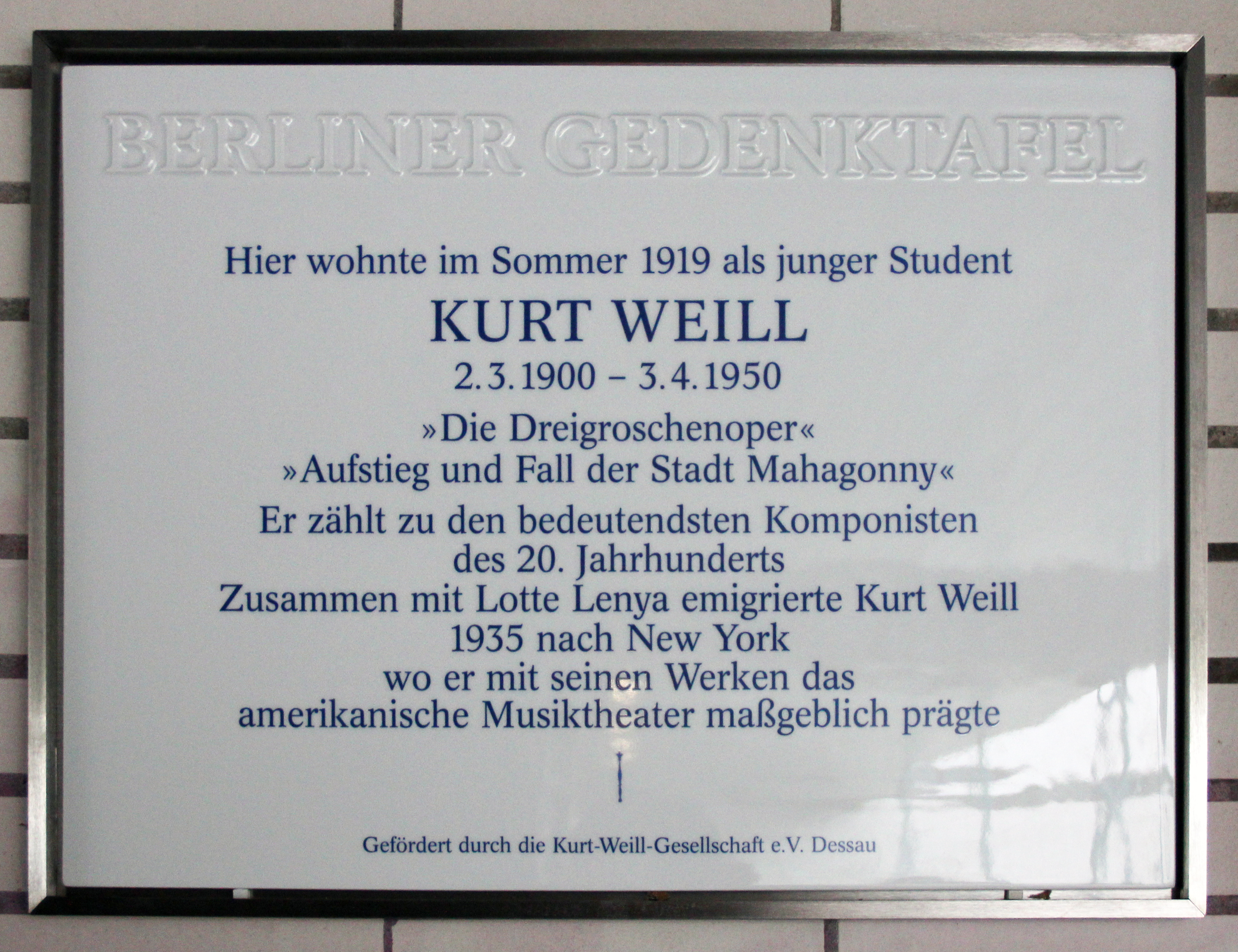
Berlin memorial plaque, Berlin-Hansaviertel, Germany

Back in Berlin, Weill had an interview with Ferruccio Busoni in December 1920. After examining some of Weill's compositions, Busoni accepted him as one of five master students in composition at the Preussische Akademie der Künste in Berlin.

From January 1921 to December 1923, Weill studied music composition with him and also counterpoint with Philipp Jarnach in Berlin. During his first year he composed his first symphony, Sinfonie in einem Satz, as well as the lieder Die Bekehrte (Goethe) and two Rilkelieder for voice and piano. Busoni, then approaching the end of his life, was a major influence on Weill. Where Weill's early compositions reflect the post-Wagnerian Romanticism and Expressionism common in German classical music of that era, Busoni was a Neoclassicist. Busoni's influence can be seen especially in Weill's vocal and stage works, which moved steadily away from having the music reflect the characters' emotions to have it function as (often ironic) commentary. This was Weill's own path to some of the same notions of Epic theater and the Verfremdungseffekt (distancing effect) advocated by his future collaborator Brecht.

To support his family in Leipzig, Weill also worked as a pianist in a Bierkeller tavern. In 1922, Weill joined the November Group's music faction. That year he composed a psalm, a divertimento for orchestra, and Sinfonia Sacra: Fantasia, Passacaglia, and Hymnus for Orchestra. On November 18, 1922, his children's pantomime Die Zaubernacht (The Magic Night) premiered at the Theater am Kurfürstendamm; it was the first public performance of any of Weill's works in the field of musical theatre.

Out of financial need, Weill taught music theory and composition to private students from 1923 to 1925. Among his students were Claudio Arrau, Maurice Abravanel, Heinz Jolles (later known as Henry Jolles), Nikos Skalkottas, and Esther Zweig. Arrau, Abravanel, and Jolles remained members of Weill's circle of friends thereafter, and Jolles's sole surviving composition predating the rise of the Nazi regime in 1933 is a fragment of a work for four pianos he and Weill wrote jointly.

Weill's compositions during his last year of studies included Quodlibet, an orchestral suite version of Die Zaubernacht; Frauentanz, seven medieval poems for soprano, flute, viola, clarinet, French horn, and bassoon; and Recordare for choir and children's choir to words from the Book of Lamentations. Further premieres that year included a performance of his Divertimento for Orchestra by the Berlin Philharmonic under the direction of Heinz Unger on April 10, 1923, and the Hindemith-Amar Quartet's rendering of Weill's String Quartet, Op. 8, on June 24, 1923. In December 1923, Weill finished his studies with Busoni.

=== Success in the 1920s and early 1930s ===
In 1922 he joined the Novembergruppe, a group of leftist Berlin artists that included Hanns Eisler and Stefan Wolpe. In February 1924 the conductor Fritz Busch introduced him to the dramatist Georg Kaiser, with whom Weill would have a long-lasting creative partnership resulting in several one-act operas. At Kaiser's house in Grünheide, Weill first met the singer and actress Lotte Lenya in the summer of 1924. The couple were married twice: in 1926 and again in 1937 (after their divorce in 1933). She took great care to support Weill's work, and after his death she took it upon herself to increase awareness of his music, forming the Kurt Weill Foundation. From November 1924 to May 1929, Weill wrote hundreds of reviews for the influential and comprehensive radio program guide Der deutsche Rundfunk; Hans Siebert von Heister had already worked with Weill in the November Group, and offered Weill the job shortly after becoming editor-in-chief.

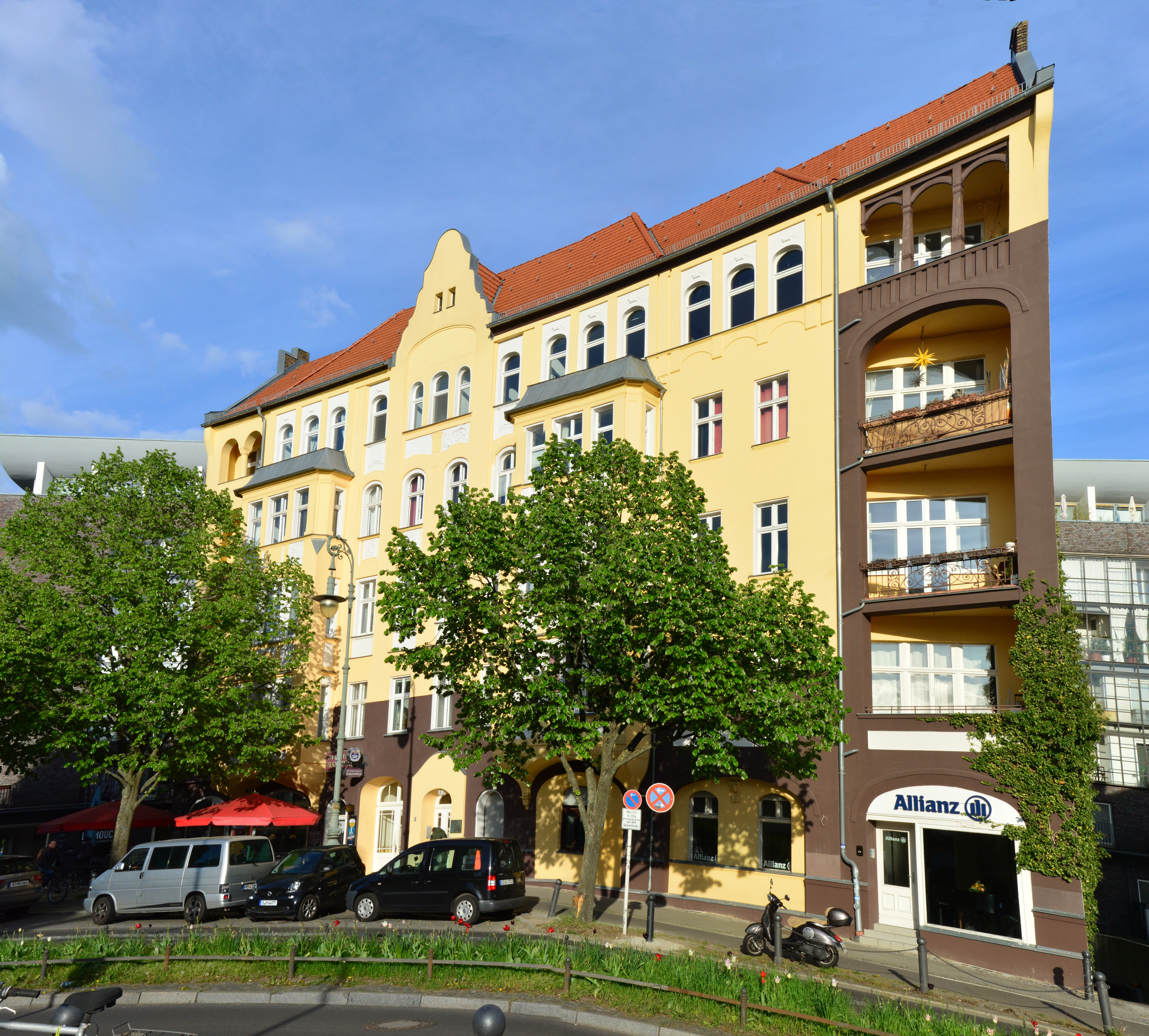
After their 1926 marriage, Weill and Lenya lived for a time in Georg Kaiser's apartment at Luisenplatz 3, Berlin-Charlottenburg; Kaiser preferred to live at his lake house.

Although he had some success with his first mature non-stage works (such as the String Quartet, Op. 8, and the Concerto for Violin and Wind Orchestra, Op. 12), which were influenced by Gustav Mahler, Arnold Schoenberg and Igor Stravinsky, Weill tended more and more towards vocal music and musical theatre. His musical theatre work and his songs were extremely popular in Germany in the late 1920s and early 1930s. Weill's music was admired by composers such as Alban Berg, Alexander von Zemlinsky, Darius Milhaud and Stravinsky, but it was also criticized by others: Schoenberg, who later revised his opinion, and Anton Webern.

His best-known work is The Threepenny Opera (1928), a reworking of John Gay's The Beggar's Opera, written in collaboration with Bertolt Brecht. Engel directed the original production of The Threepenny Opera in 1928. It contains Weill's most famous song, "Mack the Knife" ("Die Moritat von Mackie Messer"). Textually Threepenny Opera—like the Beggar's Opera before it—is satire and social commentary; but for Weill, coming from a musical perspective, it was something else as well: "It gives us the opportunity to make opera the subject matter for an evening in the theater", part of what Weill saw as a lifelong process to "reform" opera for the modern stage. The stage success was filmed by G. W. Pabst in two language versions: Die 3-Groschen-Oper and L'opéra de quat' sous. Weill and Brecht tried to stop the film adaptation through a well publicized lawsuit—which Weill won and Brecht lost.

Weill continued to work with Brecht on the musical Happy End (1929), best known for the songs "Surabaya Johnny", "Bilbao Song", and "Sailor's Tango"; the children's opera Der Jasager (1930); and the opera Rise and Fall of the City of Mahagonny (1930), best known for "Alabama Song" (later recorded by The Doors, among many others). Weill's working association with Brecht, although successful, came to an end over politics in 1930. Though Weill associated with socialism, after Brecht tried to push their work even further in a left-wing direction, Weill commented, according to his wife Lotte Lenya, that he was unable to "set the Communist Manifesto to music."

While in Germany in the early 1930s, Weill also collaborated with the American virtuoso banjoist Mike Danzi in an early production of his opera Rise and Fall of the City of Mahagonny. During a rehearsal, Weill congratulated Danzi for his accurate interpretation of the chords found in his score while noting that most other banjoists had complained that they were not actually written for the banjo at all.

=== Life in Paris and New York ===
Weill fled Nazi Germany in March 1933. A prominent and popular Jewish composer, Weill was officially denounced for his political views and sympathies, and became a target of the Nazi authorities, who criticized and interfered with performances of his later stage works, such as Rise and Fall of the City of Mahagonny (Aufstieg und Fall der Stadt Mahagonny, 1930), Die Bürgschaft (1932), and Der Silbersee (1933). With no option but to leave Germany, he went first to Paris, where he worked once more with Brecht (after a project with Jean Cocteau failed) on the ballet The Seven Deadly Sins.

On April 13, 1933, his musical The Threepenny Opera was given its premiere on Broadway, but closed after 13 performances to mixed reviews. In 1934 he completed his Symphony No. 2, his last purely orchestral work, conducted in Amsterdam and New York by Bruno Walter, and also the music for Jacques Deval's play Marie Galante. A production of his operetta Der Kuhhandel (A Kingdom for a Cow) took him to London in 1935, and later that year he went to the United States in connection with The Eternal Road, a "Biblical Drama" by Franz Werfel that had been commissioned by members of New York's Jewish community and was premiered in 1937 at the Manhattan Opera House, running for 153 performances.

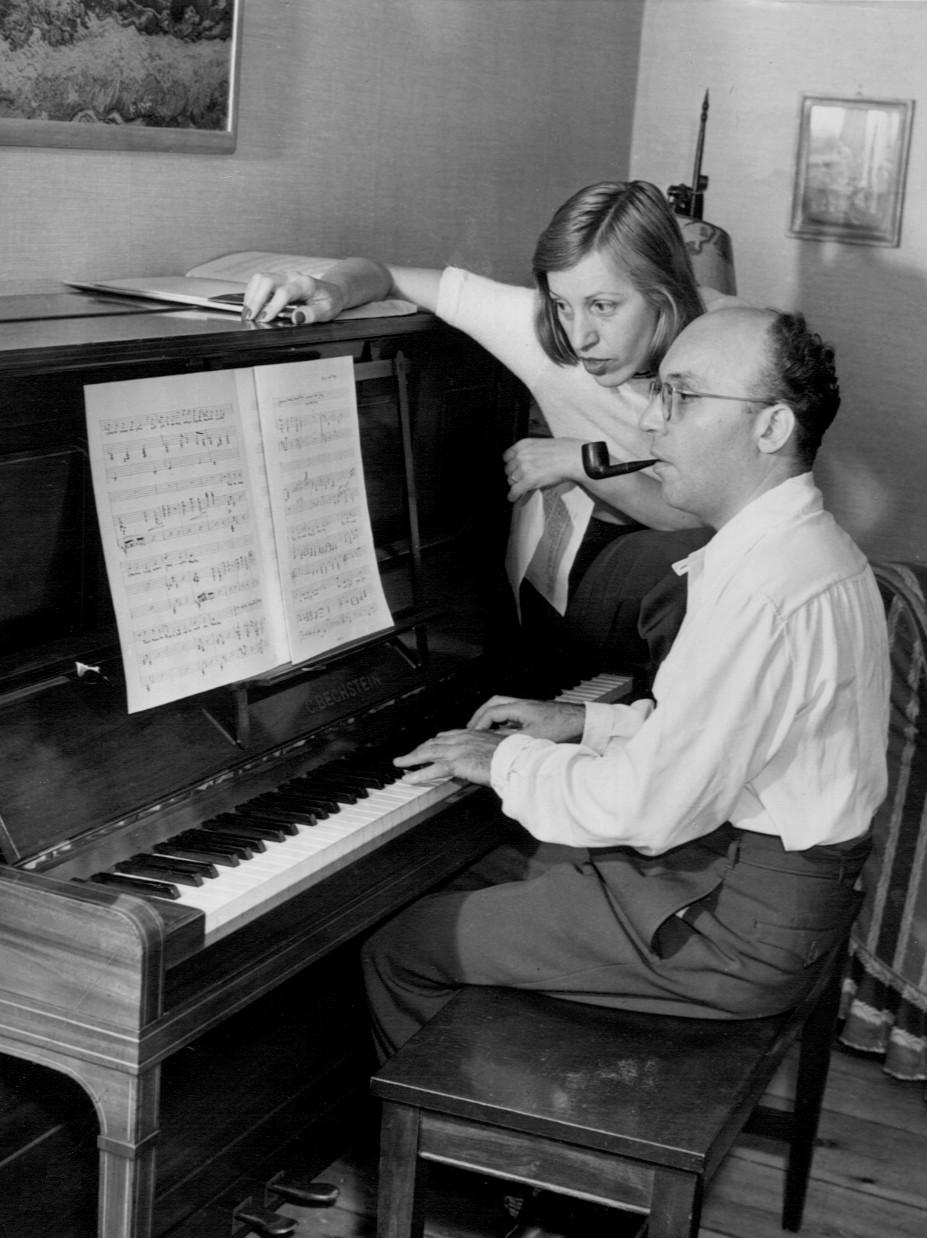
Weill and Lenya at home in 1942

He and Lotte moved to New York City on September 10, 1935, living first at the St. Moritz Hotel before moving to an apartment at 231 East 62nd Street, between Third and Second Avenues. They rented an old house with Paul Green during the summer of 1936 near Pine Brook Country Club in Nichols, Connecticut, the summer home of the Group Theatre, while finishing Johnny Johnson. Some of the other artists who summered there in 1936 were Elia Kazan, Harry Morgan, John Garfield, Lee J. Cobb, Will Geer, Clifford Odets, Howard da Silva and Irwin Shaw.

Rather than continue to write in the same style that had characterized his European compositions, Weill made a study of American popular and stage music. His American output contains individual songs and entire shows that not only became highly respected and admired, but have been seen as seminal works in the development of the American musical. In 1939 he wrote the music for Railroads on Parade, a musical spectacular put on at the 1939 World's Fair in New York to celebrate the American railroad industry (book by Edward Hungerford). Unique among Broadway composers of the time, Weill insisted on writing his own orchestrations (with some very few exceptions, such as the dance music in Street Scene). He worked with writers such as Maxwell Anderson and Ira Gershwin, and wrote a film score for Fritz Lang (You and Me, 1938). Weill himself strove to find a new way of creating an American opera that would be both commercially and artistically successful. The most interesting attempt in this direction is Street Scene, based on a play by Elmer Rice, with lyrics by Langston Hughes. For his work on Street Scene Weill was awarded the inaugural Tony Award for Best Original Score.

In the 1940s Weill lived in downstate New York near the New Jersey border and made frequent trips both to New York City and to Hollywood for his work for theatre and film. Weill was active in political movements encouraging American entry into World War II, and after America joined the war in 1941, Weill enthusiastically collaborated in numerous artistic projects supporting the war effort both abroad and on the home front. He and Maxwell Anderson also joined the volunteer civil service by working as air raid wardens on High Tor Mountain between their homes in New City, New York and Haverstraw, New York in Rockland County. Weill became a naturalized citizen of the United States on August 27, 1943.

Weill had ideals of writing music that served a socially useful purpose. In the US, he wrote Down in the Valley, an opera including the song of the same name and other American folk songs. He also wrote a number of songs in support of the American war effort, including the satirical "Schickelgruber" (with lyrics by Howard Dietz), "Buddy on the Nightshift" (with Oscar Hammerstein) and – with Brecht again as in his earlier career – the "Ballad of the Nazi Soldier's Wife" ("Und was bekam des Soldaten Weib?"). Intended for broadcast to Germany, the song chronicled the progress of the Nazi war machine through the gifts sent to the proud wife at home by her man at the front: furs from Oslo, a silk dress from Paris etc., until finally, from Russia, she receives her widow's veil.

Apart from "Mack the Knife" and "Pirate Jenny" from The Threepenny Opera, his most famous songs include "Alabama Song" (from Mahagonny), "Surabaya Johnny" (from Happy End), "Speak Low" (from One Touch of Venus), "Lost in the Stars" (from the musical of that name), "My Ship" (from Lady in the Dark), and "September Song" (from Knickerbocker Holiday).

== Death ==
Weill suffered a heart attack shortly after his 50th birthday and died on April 3, 1950, in New York City. The text and music on his gravestone come from the song "A Bird of Passage" from Lost in the Stars, itself adapted from a quotation from the Venerable Bede: He is buried at Mount Repose Cemetery, in Haverstraw, New York.

This is the life of men on earth:
Out of darkness we come at birth
Into a lamplit room, and then –
Go forward into dark again.
(lyric: Maxwell Anderson)

An excerpt from Maxwell Anderson's eulogy for Weill read:

I wish, of course, that he had been lucky enough to have had a little more time for his work. I could wish the times in which he lived had been less troubled. But these things were as they were – and Kurt managed to make thousands of beautiful things during the short and troubled time he had ...

== Influence ==
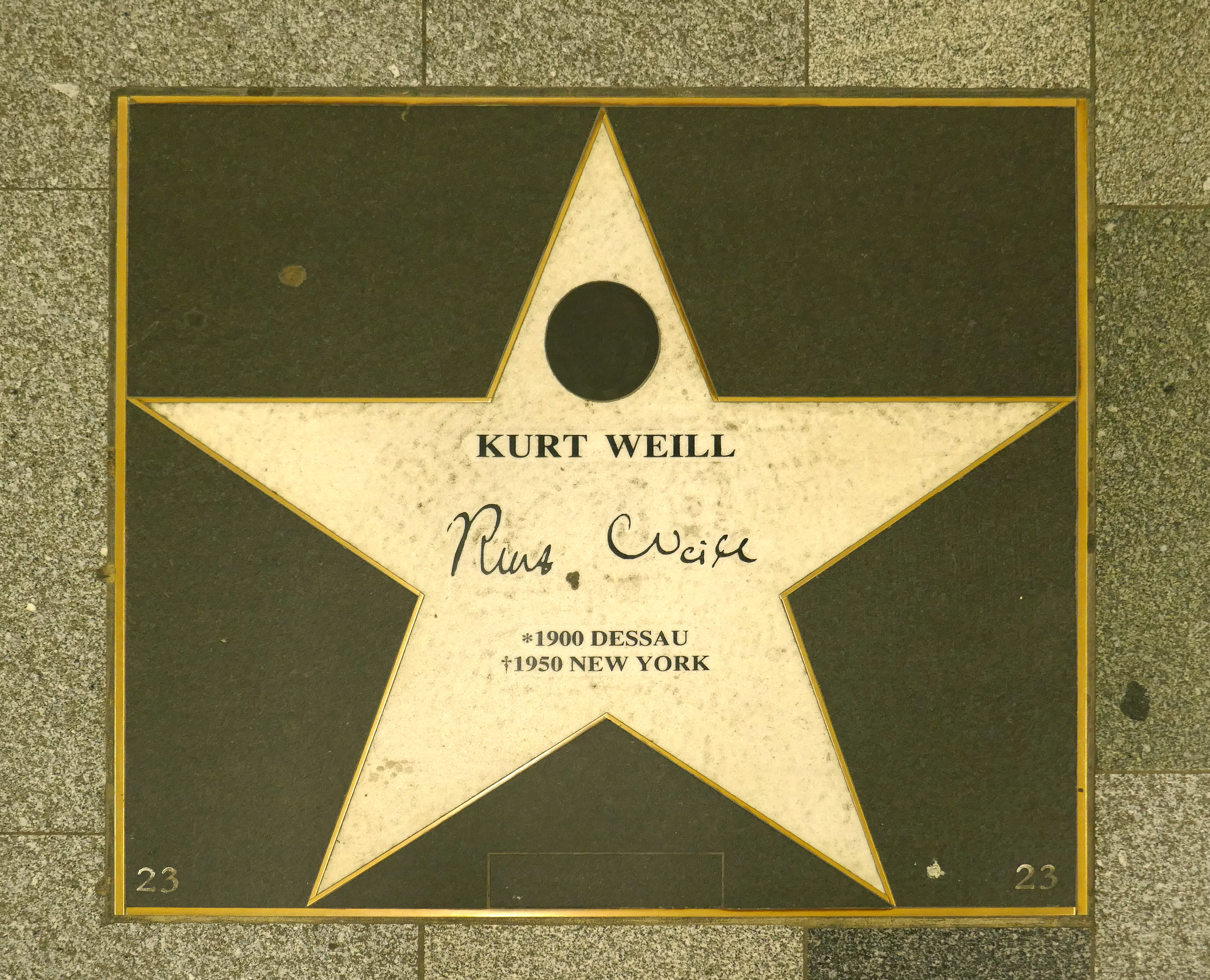
Star on Musik Meile Vienna

Weill's music continues to be performed both in popular and classical contexts. In Weill's lifetime, his work was most associated with the voice of his wife, Lotte Lenya, but shortly after his death "Mack the Knife" was established by Louis Armstrong and Bobby Darin as a jazz standard. His music has since been recorded by many performers, ranging from Nina Simone, Judy Garland, Frank Sinatra, The Doors, Milva, Willie Nelson, Ella Fitzgerald, David Bowie, Robbie Williams, Judy Collins, John Zorn, Dagmar Krause, Steeleye Span, The Young Gods, and PJ Harvey to New York's Metropolitan Opera and the Vienna Radio Symphony Orchestra. Singers as varied as Teresa Stratas, Ute Lemper, Gisela May, Anne Sofie von Otter, Max Raabe, Heinz Karl Gruber, Dee Dee Bridgewater, Rufus Wainwright and Marianne Faithfull have recorded entire albums of his music.

In 1985, Hal Willner produced Lost in the Stars: The Music of Kurt Weill, a tribute album in which Weill's songs were interpreted by a variety of artists, including Todd Rundgren, Tom Waits, Lou Reed, Charlie Haden and Sting.

Amanda Palmer, singer-pianist of the Brechtian Punk Cabaret duo The Dresden Dolls, has Kurt Weill's name on the front of her keyboard (a pun on the name of the instrument maker Kurzweil) as a tribute to the composer. In 1991, the seminal Swiss industrial band The Young Gods released an album of Kurt Weill songs, The Young Gods Play Kurt Weill. Weill has also been often cited as an influence on Goldfrapp's Felt Mountain. In 2008, Weill's songs were performed by Canadian musicians (including Sarah Slean and Mary Margaret O'Hara) in a tribute concert as part of the first annual Canwest Cabaret Festival in Toronto. In 2009 Duke Special released an EP, Huckleberry Finn, of five songs from an unfinished musical by Kurt Weill based on the novel by Mark Twain.

Kurt Weill is a member of the American Theater Hall of Fame.

There is a statue of Kurt Weill and Bertolt Brecht in Dessau at the intersection of Kurt-Weill-Straße and Karlstraße.

== Kurt Weill Centre ==
The Kurt Weill Centre (German: Kurt-Weill-Zentrum) in Dessau was founded in 1993. It provides a museum, library, archive and media centre and organises an annual festival celebrating the composer's work. It is housed in the Feininger house, a house designed by the architect Walter Gropius which was originally lived in by the artist Lyonel Feininger. The property is part of the World Heritage site the Bauhaus and its Sites in Weimar, Dessau and Bernau. The centre, with its collection of material on Weill, is listed as a cultural memorial of national importance. The centre is one of the "Beacons of light" of the Konferenz Nationaler Kultureinrichtungen (Conference of National Cultural Institutions), a union of cultural institutions in the new states of Germany i.e. area that was formerly East Germany.

== Kurt Weill Foundation for Music ==
Founded by Lotte Lenya in 1962, the non-profit, private foundation is dedicated to promoting understanding of Weill's life and works and preserving the legacies of Weill and Lenya. The foundation administers the internationally recognized Lotte Lenya Competition, a grant program, various sponsorships and fellowships, the Weill-Lenya Research Center, and the Kurt Weill Prize, and publishes the Kurt Weill Edition and the Kurt Weill Newsletter. Trustees of the New York-based organization have included Harold Prince, Victoria Clark, Jeanine Tesori, Tazewell Thompson, and Teresa Stratas.

== Relatives ==
Weill's grandmother was Jeanette Hochstetter of Liedolsheim in Baden-Württemberg. Weill was one of four members of the same Hochstetter family to lead distinguished careers in the fields of music and literature. His first cousin once removed was Caesar Hochstetter, a composer and arranger who collaborated with Max Reger and who dedicated Aquarelles, Op. 25, to him.

Caesar's younger brother was Gustav Hochstetter, professor of literature at the University of Brussels, writer and poet and friend of Wilhelm Busch. His second cousin was the childhood prodigy pianist, Lisy Fischer.

== Compositions ==
=== Concert works ===
==== Cantatas ====
- 1920 : Sulamith, choral fantasy for soprano, female chorus and orchestra (lost)
- 1927 : Der neue Orpheus, cantata for soprano, solo violin and orchestra, Op. 16 (text: Yvan Goll)
- 1927 : Der Tod im Wald, cantata for bass and band (originally belonged to Das Berliner Requiem)
- 1928 : Das Berliner Requiem, cantata for tenor, baritone, male chorus (or three male voices) and wind orchestra (text: Bertolt Brecht)
- 1929 : Der Lindberghflug, cantata for tenor, baritone and bass soloists, chorus and orchestra (text: Bertolt Brecht and Elisabeth Hauptmann, first version with music by Paul Hindemith and Weill, second version, also 1929, with music exclusively by Weill)
- 1940 : The Ballad of Magna Carta, cantata for tenor and bass soloists, chorus and orchestra (text: Maxwell Anderson)
- 1946 : "Kiddush", commissioned by cantor David Putterman, premiered at a Kiddush on May 10, 1946, at Park Avenue Synagogue

==== Chamber music ====
- 1918 : String Quartet in B minor (without opus number)
- 1923 : String Quartet, Op. 8
- 1919–1921 : Sonata for Cello and Piano

==== Piano music ====
- 1917 : Intermezzo
- 1937 : Albumblatt for Erika (transcription of the pastorale from Der Weg der Verheissung)

==== Orchestral works ====
- 1919 : Suite for orchestra
- 1919 : Die Weise von Liebe und Tod, symphonic poem for orchestra after Rainer Maria Rilke (lost)
- 1921 : Symphony No.1 in one movement for orchestra
- 1922 : Divertimento for orchestra, Op. 5 (unfinished, reconstructed by David Drew)
- 1922 : Sinfonia Sacra, Fantasia, Passacaglia and Hymnus for orchestra, Op. 6 (unfinished)
- 1923 : Quodlibet, suite for orchestra from the pantomime Zaubernacht, Op. 9
- 1925 : Concerto for violin and wind orchestra, Op. 12
- 1927 : Bastille Musik, suite for wind orchestra (arranged by David Drew, 1975) from the stage music to Gustav III, by August Strindberg
- 1929 : Kleine Dreigroschenmusik, suite from Die Dreigroschenoper for wind orchestra, piano and percussion, (premiere conducted by Otto Klemperer)
- 1934 : Suite panaméenne for chamber orchestra, (from Marie Galante)
- 1934 : Symphony No. 2 in three movements for orchestra, (premiere by Royal Concertgebouw orchestra under Bruno Walter)
- 1947 : Hatikvah, arrangement of the Israeli National Anthem for orchestra

==== Lieder, Lieder cycles, songs and chansons ====
- 1919 : "Die stille Stadt", for voice and piano, text: Richard Dehmel
- 1923 : Frauentanz, Op. 10, song cycle for soprano, flute, viola, clarinet, horn and bassoon (after medieval poems)
- 1923 : Stundenbuch, song cycle for baritone and orchestra, text: Rainer Maria Rilke
- 1925 : "Klopslied", for high voice, two piccolos and bassoon ("Ick sitze da un' esse Klops" – Berliner Lied)
- 1927 : Vom Tod im Wald (Death in the Forest), Op. 23, ballad for bass solo and ten wind instruments, text: Bertolt Brecht
- 1928 : "Berlin im Licht-Song", slow-fox, text: Kurt Weill; composed for the exhibition Berlin im Licht, first performance in Wittenbergplatz (with orchestra) on October 13, and on October 16 in the Kroll Opera (with voice and piano)
- 1928 : "Die Muschel von Margate: Petroleum Song", slow-fox, text: Felix Gasbarra for the play by Leo Lania, Konjunktur
- 1928 : "Zu Potsdam unter den Eichen" ("In Potsdam under the Oak Trees"), song for voice and piano, alternatively male chorus a cappella, text: Bertolt Brecht
- 1928 : "Das Lied von den braunen Inseln", text: Lion Feuchtwanger, from the play by same author, Petroleum Inseln
- 1930?: "Lied vom weißen Käse" ("Song of the White Cheese") – unpublished, discovered in Berlin at the Free University of Berlin in 2017
- 1933 : "Der Abschiedsbrief", text: Erich Kästner, intended for Marlene Dietrich
- 1933 : "La complainte de Fantômas", text: Robert Desnos; for a broadcast of Fantômas in November 1933 (the music was lost, and later reconstructed by Jacques Loussier for Catherine Sauvage)
- 1933 : "Es regnet" ("It's Raining"), text: Jean Cocteau (direct into German)
- 1934 : "Je ne t'aime pas", text: Maurice Magre for the soprano Lys Gauty
- 1934 : "Les Filles de Bordeaux", text: Jacques Deval, from Marie Galante
- 1934 : "J'attends un navire", text: Jacques Deval, from Marie Galante; as an independent song for Lys Gauty; used for the "Hymne der Resistance" during the Second World War
- 1934 : "Youkali" (originally the "Tango habanera", instrumental movement in Marie Galante), Text: Roger Fernay
- 1934 : "Complainte de la Seine", text: Maurice Magre
- 1939 : "Stopping by Woods on a Snowy Evening", song for voice and piano, text: Robert Frost (unfinished)
- 1939 : "Nanna's Lied", text: Bertolt Brecht, the song of a prostitute, from a play satirizing the Nazi party, written as a Christmas present for his wife Lotte Lenya; quotes Ballade des dames du temps jadis
- 1942–47 : Three Walt Whitman Songs, later Four Walt Whitman Songs for voice and piano (or orchestra), text: Walt Whitman
1. Oh Captain! My Captain! (Christmas 1941)
2. Dirge for Two Veterans (January 1942)
3. Beat! Beat! Drums! (Spring 1942)
4. Come Up From The Fields, Father (1947)
- 1942 : Mine Eyes Have Seen the Glory, patriotic song arrangements for narrator, male chorus, and orchestra, of the "Battle Hymn of the Republic" (text: Julia Ward Howe), "The Star-Spangled Banner" (text: Francis Scott Key), "America" (text: Samuel Francis Smith) and "Beat! Beat! Drums!" (text: Walt Whitman)
- 1942–44 : Propaganda Songs, for voice and piano; written for the Lunch Hours Follies performed for the workers of a shipbuilding workshop in New York, then broadcast:
  - 1942 : "Buddy on the Nightshift", text: Oscar Hammerstein
  - 1942 : "Schickelgruber", text: Howard Dietz
- 1942 : "Und was bekam des Soldaten Weib?" ("And what was sent to the soldier's wife?"), ballad for voice and piano, text: Bertolt Brecht
- 1944 : "Wie lange noch?", text: Walter Mehring; premiere: Lotte Lenya

==== Choral ====
- 1923 : Recordare, Op. 11

=== Film music ===
- 1931 : The Threepenny Opera, director G. W. Pabst, two versions: in German and French
- 1938 : You and Me, director Fritz Lang
- 1945 : Where Do We Go from Here?, text: Ira Gershwin
- 1948 : One Touch of Venus, starring: Robert Walker, Ava Gardner and Dick Haymes

== Select discography ==
=== Orchestral, chamber, choral and other works ===
- Berliner Requiem / Violin Concerto, Op. 12 / Vom Tod im Walde. Ensemble Musique Oblique/ Philippe Herreweghe (Harmonia Mundi, 1997)
- Kleine Dreigroschenmusik / Mahagonny Songspiel / Happy End / Berliner Requiem / Violin Concerto, Op. 12 / Ballade vom Tod im Walde, Op. 23 / Pantomime I (from Der Protagonist, Op. 14) London Sinfonietta, David Atherton, Nona Liddell (violin), Meriel Dickinson (mezzo-soprano), Mary Thomas (mezzo-soprano), Philip Langridge (tenor), Ian Partridge (tenor), Benjamin Luxon (baritone), Michael Rippon (bass), (Deutsche Grammophon 4594422, 1999)
- Kurt Weill à Paris, Marie Galante and other works. Loes Luca, Ensemble Dreigroschen, directed by Giorgio Bernasconi, assai, 2000
- Melodie Kurta Weill'a i coś ponadto Kazik Staszewski (SP Records, 2001)
- Complete String Quartets. Leipziger Streichquartett (MDG 307 1071–2)
- Symphonies 1 & 2. BBC Symphony Orchestra, Gary Bertini (EMI, 1968)

=== Song collections ===
- Lotte Lenya sings Kurt Weill's The Seven Deadly Sins & Berlin Theatre Songs (Sony 1997)
- Speak Low – Songs by Kurt Weill – Anne Sofie von Otter, conducted by John Eliot Gardiner (Deutsche Grammophon 1995)
- Youkali: Art Songs by Satie, Poulenc and Weill. Patricia O'Callaghan (Marquis, 2003)
- The Unknown Kurt Weill (Nonesuch LP D-79019, 1981) – Teresa Stratas, soprano, Richard Woitach, piano. Track list: "Nanna's Lied" (1939), "Complainte de la Seine" (1934), "Klops-Lied" (1925), "Berlin im Licht-song" (1928), "Und was bekam des Soldaten Weib?" (1943), "Die Muschel von Margate: Petroleum Song" (1928), "Wie Lange Noch?" (1944), "Youkali: Tango Habanera" (1935?), "Der Abschiedsbrief" (1933?), "Es Regnet" (1933), "Buddy on the Nightshift" (1942), "Schickelgruber" (1942), "Je ne t'aime pas" (1934), "Das Lied von den Braunen Inseln" (1928)
- Georgia Brown: September Song – Music of Kurt Weill, Decca LP SKL 4509 (1962), conducted by Ian Fraser
- Dee Dee Bridgewater: This is New (2002)

=== Tributes ===
- Lost in the Stars: The Music of Kurt Weill – produced by Hal Wilner, with performances by Tom Waits, Lou Reed, Sting, Marianne Faithfull, Carla Bley, Charlie Haden, John Zorn and others. (A&M Records, 1985)
- September Songs – The Music of Kurt Weill – also produced by Wilner, with performances by Elvis Costello, PJ Harvey, Nick Cave, William S. Burroughs, and others (Sony Music, 1997)
- Gianluigi Trovesi/Gianni Coscia: Round About Weill (ECM, 2005)
- The Young Gods Play Kurt Weill (Pias, April 1991), studio recording of the songs performed live in 1989.
- Ben Bagley's Kurt Weill Revisited and Kurt Weill Revisited, Vol. 2, with performances by Chita Rivera, Ann Miller, Estelle Parsons, John Reardon, Tammy Grimes, Nell Carter, Arthur Siegel, and Jo Sullivan, among others. (Painted Smiles Records)
- An Evening of Kurt Weill, starring Bebe Neuwirth, Roger Rees, and Larry Marshall, was performed in New York City at Alice Tully Hall; Rees directed the production.

== See also ==
- A Kurt Weill Cabaret (Broadway 1979), originally The World of Kurt Weill in Song (off-Broadway 1963)
- Berlin to Broadway with Kurt Weill (off-Broadway 1971, Broadway 2000)
- LoveMusik (Broadway 2007)

== Notes and references ==
Notes

Sources

- Hinton, Stephen; Schebera, Jürgen, eds. (2000). Musik und musikalisches Theater – Gesammelte Schriften. Mainz: Schott Musik International. ISBN 3-7957-0423-5.
- Hinton, Stephen (2012). Weill's Musical Theater: Stages of Reform. University of California Press. ISBN 978-0520271777.
- Jarman, Douglas (1982). Kurt Weill: An Illustrated Biography. Bloomington: Indiana University Press. ISBN 025314650X.
- Mercado, Mario R. (1989). Kurt Weill: A Guide to His Works. Kurt Weill Foundation for Music.
