= J'attends un navire =

Song
- Language: French
- English title: I Am Waiting for a Ship
- Written: 1934
- Songwriters: Kurt Weill and Jacques Deval

"J'attends un navire", also known as "I Am Waiting for a Ship", is a song written in 1934 by Kurt Weill with lyrics by Jacques Deval. The song was written for the musical Marie Galante but later became an unofficial anthem of the French Resistance.

== Background ==
The song was one of a number of musical numbers prepared by Weill for the stage adaptation of Deval's bestselling novel Marie Galante, about a French prostitute who becomes stranded in Panama and must work as a spy to earn enough money to return to France. Weill entered into the project enthusiastically, since he needed the work as a recent refugee from Nazi Germany, but the collaboration with Deval was contentious, with the two barely communicating. Nevertheless, after a year of writing, the play premiered at the Théâtre de Paris on 22 December 1934. Poorly received by audiences and critics, the play ran only three weeks, but the song took on a life of its own through sheet music sales and a popular recording by the show's star Florelle.

Musically, the song is part of the genre of chanson réaliste, a style of cabaret song written from the point of view of working class or otherwise abject women, popular in the first part of the 20th century in France. The lyrics are sung from the point-of-view of Marie, a prostitute, who is selling herself on the streets for two dollars ("Beautiful girl!/Beautiful French girl/Two dollars!/You will be pleased"). The singer goes on to say she is not waiting for a man, but for a ship to carry her away from her current life ("It is not you I'm waiting for./I wait for a ship/which will come and to drive it, this ship has the wind of my heart which sighs/the water of my tears will carry it").

== Lyrics ==
Beautiful girl! Bella Francesa!
Deux dollars!
Tu seras content.
Entre chez moi! Mets-toi à l'aise!
Prends-moi, paye-moi
Et va-t'en!
Pars, ce n'est pas toi que j'attends.
J'attends un navire qui viendra
Et pour le conduire, ce navire a
Le vent de mon coeur qui soupire
L'eau de mes pleurs le portera
Et si la mer veut le détruire
Ce navire qui viendra
Je le porterai, ce navire
Jusqu'à Bordeaux entre mes bras!
Là-bas on m'appelait Marie
Et les garçons au coin des champs
Me chatouillaient pour que je rie
Et que je cède en me battant.
Mais toi pour qui je suis "Chérie"
Prends-moi, paye-moi
Et va-t'en!
J'attends un navire qui viendra
Et pour le conduire, ce navire a
Le vent de mon coeur qui soupire
L'eau de mes pleurs le portera
Et si la mer veut le détruire
Ce navire...

Translation:

Beautiful girl! Beautiful French girl...
Two dollars!
You will be pleased.
Come into my place. Make yourself comfortable!
Take me! Pay me!
And go away. Leave!
It is not you I'm waiting for.
I wait for a ship which will come
and to drive it, this ship has
the wind of my heart which sighs
the water of my tears will carry it;
and if the sea wants to destroy it,
this ship that will come,
I will carry it, this ship,
all the way to Bordeaux in my arms!
There they used to call me Marie
and the boys, in the corner of the fields
would tickle me to make me laugh
and make me yield while fighting me.
But you for whom I am "Darling"
Take me, pay me
and go away.
I wait for a ship which will come
and to drive it, this ship has
the wind of my heart which sighs
the water of my tears will carry it;
and if the sea wants to destroy it,
this ship ...

== Notable versions ==
The song enjoyed a brief vogue in the 1930s, recorded by cabaret singers like Lys Gauty. It was translated into English by the theatre critic Michael Feingold for the 1972 Broadway revue Berlin to Broadway with Kurt Weill: A Musical Voyage.

Year	Title	Performer	Genre	Label	Catalog #
1934	"J'attends un navire"	Lys Gauty	Pop	Polydor	25853
1935	"Le Grand Lustecru/J'attends un navire"	Florelle	Pop	Polydor	52401
1943	Six Songs by Kurt Weill	Lotte Lenya	Pop	Bost Records	BA 8
1972	"I Wait for a Ship" on Berlin to Broadway with Kurt Weill	Margery Cohen (English lyrics by Michael Feingold)	Pop	Paramount	PAS-4000
1986	Ute Lemper singt Kurt Weill	Ute Lemper	Pop	Bayer	BR 30 018

== In other media ==
- The song was used as the theme for the Edie Adams variety television show, Here's Edie.
- An instrumental version of the song was used as the theme for the ITV television series Wish Me Luck, about a trio of British spies.

== See also ==
- "J'attendrai", a 1938 popular song
- Marie Galante, 1934 film of Deval's play
