= Saturday Night Live at Home =

16th, 17th and 18th episodes of the 45th season of Saturday Night Live

"Saturday Night Live at Home" refers to the final three episodes of the 45th season of the late-night comedy program Saturday Night Live. Whereas SNL typically consists of sketches performed live in-studio, these "at Home" episodes were recorded remotely due to the impact of the COVID-19 pandemic on television; none of the sketches were performed live for any of these episodes, and none of the participants in any sketch from these shows were in the same physical location.

The first episode aired on April 11, 2020. The episode was hosted by Tom Hanks, and its musical guest was Chris Martin. A segment also paid tribute to Hal Willner, music producer for SNL from 1980 until his death from COVID-19 – four days before the episode. It was received positively by critics. The second episode aired on April 25. The episode did not have a credited host, but Brad Pitt appeared in the cold open and introduced the episode's musical guest, Miley Cyrus. The third episode aired on May 9 and acted as a Mother's Day-themed episode as well as the season finale. The episode's host was Kristen Wiig, and its musical guests were Boyz II Men and Babyface.

In contrast to regular episodes, where the host would have been involved in most sketches of the night, and where the host and musical guest were in-studio with the cast members and crew, the involvement of the host for these episodes was scaled down to the bare minimum, and only Kristen Wiig participated in any of the show's sketches on the night she hosted. Also, by contrast, where studio episodes allowed the musical guests to perform at least twice, the remote episodes only featured a single performance from each week's musical guest.

== Background ==
At the time that the World Health Organization (WHO) announced the beginning of the COVID-19 pandemic, the show was in a previously scheduled two-week production hiatus. On March 16, in the midst of the break, production of the show was temporarily suspended. The suspension impacted three previously announced episodes: March 28, April 4, and April 11. The host and musical guest for the March 28 episode had been previously announced as John Krasinski and Dua Lipa respectively. The episode would have been Krasinski's first hosting appearance and Lipa's second musical guest appearance since 2018, with Krasinski's appearance tied to the since-delayed release of A Quiet Place Part II from March 2020 to April 2021, while Dua Lipa was promoting her third album Future Nostalgia, released as scheduled on March 27. The March 28 and April 4 episodes were replaced by reruns. It was announced in early April that the show was scheduled to resume production on April 11, with cast members remotely appearing from their individual homes. SNL returned with this remote set-up after almost all American late night programs had already made accommodations to return to air.

Long-time music producer Hal Willner died of the disease during the hiatus. Additionally, host Tom Hanks and his wife Rita Wilson had also been infected by coronavirus but recovered.

During an episode of The Strokes' radio series with guest Colin Jost, it was revealed that the band was scheduled to perform on the April 11 episode, in promotion of their new album The New Abnormal. It would have been The Strokes' fourth appearance as musical guest and first time appearing on the show since 2011. The band eventually had their fourth musical guest appearance during the October 31, 2020 episode of the 46th season.

Lastly, Aidy Bryant and Kate McKinnon, who had been cast members at the time since 2012, were originally planning on leaving at the end of the season, but the pandemic ruined those plans and thus having them stay for two more seasons, and left in 2022.

== Cast roster ==
**Repertory players**

- Beck Bennett
- Aidy Bryant
- **Michael Che**
- Pete Davidson
- Mikey Day
- Heidi Gardner
- **Colin Jost**
- Kate McKinnon
- Alex Moffat
- Kyle Mooney
- Chris Redd
- Cecily Strong
- Kenan Thompson
- Melissa Villaseñor

**Featured players**

- Chloe Fineman
- Ego Nwodim
- Bowen Yang

bold denotes "Weekend Update" anchor

== April 11 episode ==
"Saturday Night Live at Home"
- Saturday Night Live episode
- "at Home" alternate title card
- Episode no.: Season 45; Episode 16
- Presented by: Tom Hanks
- Original air date: April 11, 2020
- Running time: 90 minutes

Guest appearances
- Fred Armisen; Alec Baldwin as Donald Trump; Larry David as Bernie Sanders; Rachel Dratch; Tina Fey; Ana Gasteyer; Bill Hader; Chris Martin; John Mulaney; Paula Pell; Amy Poehler; Maya Rudolph; Adam Sandler; Molly Shannon; Emily Spivey

=== Sketches ===
- The cold open features the cast members using Zoom to do a variation of the "Live from New York..." quote.
- The opening credits music is then performed by Lenny Pickett and the Saturday Night Live Band, who all perform from home, with the cast recreating their opening credits shots from their homes.
- Tom Hanks does his opening monologue, opening up about coping with COVID-19. He also takes questions from the "audience" (actually Hanks dressed as a Frenchman and an Australian man).
- Pete Davidson is featured in a music video doing a generic Drake song parody from his mother's basement.
- Ruth Bader Ginsburg (Kate McKinnon) shows her workout regimen from her home.
- Some office co-workers (Mikey Day, Alex Moffat, Chris Redd, and Heidi Gardner) attempt to conduct a meeting via Zoom, but two receptionists (McKinnon and Aidy Bryant) have some difficulty.
- Bernie Sanders (Larry David) explains why he has decided to drop out of the 2020 United States presidential election.
- A parody ad for MasterClass: Quarantine Edition, featuring Timothée Chalamet, JoJo Siwa and Carole Baskin (all portrayed by Chloe Fineman).
- Hanks introduces Chris Martin, who does a cover of Bob Dylan's "Shelter from the Storm" from his studio, made to look like the Studio 8H stage.
- Colin Jost and Michael Che host Weekend Update, alongside some Zoom audience members. They conduct a phone interview with Donald Trump (voiced by Alec Baldwin), and Che pays tribute to his grandmother, Martha, who died due to COVID-19.
- Bailey at the Movies (Gardner) posts a new YouTube video, reviewing movies that were released before the quarantine.
- Middle-Aged Mutant Ninja Turtles – An animated sketch parodying the 1980s Teenage Mutant Ninja Turtles cartoon shows the Turtles in their middle-age. Michelangelo (voiced by Kyle Mooney) is about to be divorced from his wife as he doesn't want to give up his kids. Donatello (voiced by Kenan Thompson) gets a call from a doctor who informs him that there was a suspicious lump on his spine and the test results state that it was a benign cyst. Donatello is relieved with the news. In the park, Raphael (voiced by Beck Bennett) informs Leonardo (voiced by Day) that Shredder died. Leonardo states that they can go to the wake but not the service. When Leonardo gets annoyed that Raphael is asking for money again, Raphael weeps that he has to stop betting on golf which he doesn't watch. Middle-Aged Mutant Ninja Turtles was written by Steven Castillo, Mooney and Dan Bulla.
- Cam Playz Dat (Day) shows how bad he is at playing video games on Twitch.
- British sportscaster Bob Tisdale (Moffat) does commentary on mundane things to make up for sports cancellations.
- Mooney, Bennett, and Fred Armisen remix their FaceTime chats.
- Bryant leads a "visualizations" seminar.
- How Low Will You Go? – A game show parody hosted by Alex Burpee (Bennett) that showcases dating during quarantine featuring three female contestants (Ego Nwodim, Gardner, and Bryant) and three male contestants (Day, Davidson, and Thompson).
- Nwodim does a makeup tutorial using only Crayola markers.
- Davidson does another hip-hop music video parody showcasing his $2,000 in cash and calling himself "Andre 2000".
- Past and present SNL cast members and writers, including Armisen, Rachel Dratch, Tina Fey, Ana Gasteyer, Bill Hader, John Mulaney, Paula Pell, Amy Poehler, Maya Rudolph, Adam Sandler, Molly Shannon, and Emily Spivey, pay tribute to long-time music producer for the show, Hal Willner, who died from COVID-19, by sharing stories about him, and singing Lou Reed's "Perfect Day".
- Hanks bids the audience goodnight and tells everyone to stay safe, as the credits roll over a still photograph of the empty Studio 8H.
- In a cut for time sketch, stand-up comedian Bruce Chandling (Mooney) attempts to audition for an Easter special named Elmer's Easter Adventure.

=== Critical reception ===
Writing for The A.V. Club, Dennis Perkins gave the episode a B− for the effort put into the episode, Chris Martin's performance of "Shelter from the Storm", John Mulaney's tribute to Willner, and the creativity of several of the skits, summing up this "outlier" episode by writing, "There wasn't anything revelatory, or even especially memorable about it, except that it existed... In fact, this version of the show seems constitutionally preordained to settle precisely in the middle, no matter how long SNL eventually runs. But we could all use some reliable institutions right now, and having SNL back—even if the future of this season, like so many other things, is deeply uncertain—was surprisingly affecting." Travis Andrews of The Washington Post praised the experiment, summing up his overview of the episode, "The inventive episode, born of necessity, gave us much more than [something to do for a little while]. It gave us both the opportunity and excuse to turn off the news and laugh—even if just for a bit." Both Andrews and Bill Keveney of USA Today positioned Saturday Night Live as a unique television institution that has helped America process national tragedies such as the coronavirus pandemic or September 11, 2001 attacks; he characterized it as "strange" but offering comfort. Andy Hoglund of Entertainment Weekly said the episode was "an interesting cultural footnote—both in the history of the show, as well as for the historians taking stock of how the U.S. coped during the 2020 global pandemic", adding the show's limitations allowed them to go "full TikTok this episode. Not a bad thing. The show has been addicted to its high production values/capabilities for a while—this liberates the cast to just be weird." Matthew Dessem of Slate praised the episode for the sentiment in Willner's tribute and how well several of the sketches worked logistically. Ethan Anderson of /Film wrote that many of the sketches worked, with only three failing, "a tear of joy came to [his] eyes" at several points.

Writing for NPR, Eric Deggans conceded that while "there weren't many laugh-out-loud moments during" the episode, the effort put into the production and risk-taking made up for some of the weaker content, and particularly praised Martin's performance and the musical ode to Willner. Several other reviewers noted the uneven comedy but were happy to have the show return as a tribute to Willner and an attempt at normalcy: IndieWire's LaToya Ferguson characterized the episode as a "rocky return, despite timely humor and a touching tribute" and Judy Berman of Time called it a "weaker-than-average episode ... Yet, as I watched what the cast and writers managed to put together, prepared to be disappointed by SNL as usual, an unexpected sense of gratitude blindsided me." For The Verge, Julia Alexander noted that, while not every segment worked, the series "rarely produces a show with nothing but outstanding sketches". Robert Lloyd of Los Angeles Times wrote that it was "pretty good" all things considered but "all things not considered, it was pretty good, too", summing up, "it's good to have it there, being more or less itself". Vulture's Matthew Lowe went even further, calling Saturday Night Live "as much a public service as it is a show", writing that this episode was "less a risk than a gesture of solidarity". In The Guardian, Zach Vasquez called parts of the episode silly and endearing, summing up that it was a "valiant effort and a welcome distraction from the larger troubles of the world".

=== Ratings ===
This was the second highest-rated episode of season 45, after the Eddie Murphy-hosted December 21, 2019 edition, with an average 6.7 million total viewers and a 1.46 rating, winning the night for broadcast television networks in its time slot. This episode won the 18–49 demographic among broadcast networks with a 2.1 in 25 markets with local people meters and a 4.6 Live+Same Day household rating in the 44 local metered markets.

== April 25 episode ==
"Saturday Night Live at Home"
- Saturday Night Live episode
- Episode no.: Season 45; Episode 17
- Original air date: April 25, 2020
- Running time: 90 minutes

Guest appearances
- Judd Apatow; Fred Armisen as Giuseppe; Charles Barkley; Bad Bunny as Big Bunny; Miley Cyrus; Nathan Fillion; Tan France; DJ Khaled; John Mulaney; Brad Pitt as Anthony Fauci; Paul Rudd; Adam Sandler; Jackie Sandler; Sadie Sandler; Sunny Sandler; Rob Schneider; Jason Sudeikis as Vance; Annamarie Tendler

On April 23, 2020, the Twitter account for the series noted that a second Saturday Night Live at Home edition would air on April 25. The host and musical guest for that episode was not made public.

=== Sketches ===
- The cold open is Dr. Anthony Fauci (Brad Pitt, whom the real Fauci once joked should play him) giving a message to the American public contradicting things that President Trump has said. At the end, Pitt breaks character to thank the real Fauci, as well as the medical workers, first responders and their families before saying, "Live (kinda) from all across America, it's Saturday Night!"
- Like the previous episode, the opening credits music is then performed by Lenny Pickett and the band, who all perform from home, with the cast recreating their opening credits shots from their homes. However, because there was no credited host for this episode, the customary opening monologue that has traditionally followed the opening montage was excluded from this episode. Instead, the show cut to the first sketch after the opening credits concluded.
- What Up with That? at Home – Today's guests are Charles Barkley, DJ Khaled, and, as always, Lindsey Buckingham (Bill Hader) who just appears as a freeze frame picture. As usual, Diondre Cole (Kenan Thompson) is too busy singing his theme song to interview them. Accompanying Cole in upstaging the guests are Vance the Track Suit Guy (Jason Sudeikis), Giuseppe the funky sax player (Fred Armisen), two blue sequined dressed back up singers (Ego Nwodim and Melissa Villaseñor), Howie Hot Wheels (Mikey Day) and featured singer Quarantina (Cecily Strong) who sings "Merlot for One".
- In Depth with Brian Sutter – HLN anchor Valerie Webber (Nwodim) interviews her colleague, the COVID-positive Sutter (Day) who is at home in quarantine with his daughter who is also COVID-positive, via a remote video feed from his daughter's smartphone. His daughter operates the camera on her phone for her father while also playing with the face filters, thereby disrupting the interview. The next remote video interview with epidemiologist Dr. John Mitchell (Thompson) also features face filters being used, but unlike the preceding interview, it is done purposefully.
- Pete Davidson and Adam Sandler are featured in a music video singing an R&B quarantine song, "Stuck in the House". Rob Schneider makes a cameo appearance; Judd Apatow, Nathan Fillion, Tan France, John Mulaney, Annamarie Tendler, as well as members of Sandler's and Pete Davidson's families make non-speaking appearances in the sketch. The sketch ends stating that this music video was created by Pete's mom and Sandler's daughters Sadie and Sunny.
- Kate McKinnon and Aidy Bryant play grocery store employees advertising the supply that they do have in stock in lieu of the sold out food staple items.
- Big Dominican Lunch with Big Papi – David Ortiz (Thompson) hosts his own cooking show in quarantine. Bad Bunny appears as Ortiz's cousin "Big Bunny". Alex Moffat makes a non-speaking appearance in the sketch.
- Chloe Fineman portrays both the owner of an Airbnb, and the houseguest who overstays her welcome after quarantine.
- Chris Redd plays a convicted prisoner who was released early, due to coronavirus, unsuccessfully trying to make dates with prison penpals (Nwodim, Bryant, and Strong), thwarted by social distancing, coronavirus, and one of his penpal's surprise that he would be released so early.
- Pitt introduces Miley Cyrus, who performs a cover of Pink Floyd's "Wish You Were Here".
- Colin Jost and Michael Che do Weekend Update, this time without an audience. Jost interviews Davidson about the quarantine. At the end of the segment, a contest is announced to have fans write in jokes for Che to read on Update without reading them beforehand.
- SoulCycle instructors Phoenix (Strong), Lee (Bowen Yang), Korona (Nwodim), Toyota (Redd), Robert (Beck Bennett), and Molly (Heidi Gardner) provide at-home workouts.
- O. J. Simpson (Thompson) gives his thoughts on the pandemic.
- Paul Rudd FaceTimes with his cousin Mandy (Gardner).
- The Reveal – A Law & Order parody in which a detective (Bennett) interrogates several suspects (Yang, Strong, Redd, and Gardner) via Zoom, while showing some of the songs he is working on.
- A PornHub commercial parodying the several "We're here for you" ads from other companies made during the pandemic. The sketch features several people at their respective homes (Gardner, Day, Fineman, Redd, Villaseñor, and Nwodim) indulging in the website's content.
- Barbara DeDrew (McKinnon) of "Whiskers R We" tries to pass off her cat as several different cats while her store is closed.
- Kyle Mooney plays both the host and guest at a party, while the host sings an inner monologue about not knowing the guest's name.
- Villaseñor has a not-so-smooth date with an imaginary guy.
- Bryant shows off some of her actual journal entries from when she was younger.
- Like the last episode, the credits roll over a photograph of the empty studio 8-H.
- In a cut for time sketch, Michigan governor Gretchen Whitmer (Strong) gives a message to those protesting the shelter-at-home order.
- A second cut for time sketch has Bennett give a tour of his dilapidated home to Architectural Digest.

=== Critical reception ===
Ray Flook of Bleeding Cool, called the second episode a "charm... but a bit too polished", he characterized it by writing, "The sketches ranged from really working for me to beautiful disasters, but it was still an episode that I wanted to watch from beginning to end". Dennis Perkins reviewed the second episode for The A.V. Club and called it an improvement over the first, upping his rating to a B+, writing that there "were some ringers... but they were all (but maybe one) both welcome and wonderful" and summing this up as a "fine and refreshingly funny oddball of an episode". Andy Hoglund of Entertainment Weekly called the Pete Davidson – Adam Sandler "Stuck in the House" duet an "instant classic" while also singling out the taped segments by Chloe Fineman and Kenan Thompson. Anthony Fauci's response to the cold open was positive: "I'm a great fan of Brad Pitt, and that's the reason why, when people ask me who I would like to play me, I mention Brad Pitt because he's one of my favorite actors. I think he did a great job." Fauci also lauded Pitt for thanking him and the health care workers at the end of the monologue. "I think he showed that he is really a classy guy when, at the end, he took off his hair and thanked me and all of the health care workers... not only is he a really great actor, but he is actually a classy person." Gretchen Whitmer was likewise supportive of her portrayal by cast member Cecily Strong, sending Strong a gift package with various Michigan-brewed beers from Kalamazoo-based Bell's Brewery. Whitmer, in an interview with WJBT following the sketch's release, had joked regarding the Canadian beer Labatt Blue drank in the sketch: "We love Canada, but we drink Michigan beer!" Kenan Thompson was nominated for Outstanding Supporting Actor in a Comedy Series at the 72nd Primetime Emmy Awards for this episode, while Brad Pitt received a nomination for Outstanding Guest Actor in a Comedy Series at the 72nd Primetime Creative Arts Emmy Awards for his portrayal of Fauci.

== May 9 episode ==
"Saturday Night Live at Home"
- Saturday Night Live episode
- Episode no.: Season 45; Episode 18
- Presented by: Kristen Wiig
- Original air date: May 9, 2020
- Running time: 90 minutes

Guest appearances
- Babyface; Alec Baldwin as Donald Trump; Tina Fey; Josh Gad; Nathan Morris; Wanya Morris; Al Roker; Martin Short as Ripley; Shawn Stockman; Danny Trejo

On May 7, 2020, it was announced via Twitter that the show would air a third Saturday Night Live at Home episode on May 9, which served as the season 45 finale. The announcement initially indicated there would be no credited host or musical guest for this episode.

=== Sketches ===
- President Donald Trump (Alec Baldwin) gives a virtual commencement address to the graduating class of St. Mary Magdalene by the Expressway High School.
- Like the previous two episodes, the opening credits music is then performed by Lenny Pickett and the band, who all perform from home, with the cast recreating their opening credits shots from their homes.
- Kristen Wiig is introduced as the night's host and gives a Mother's Day-themed opening monologue.
- Heidi Gardner and Martin Short appear in a Zoom sketch as an annoying couple that has smuggled personal protective equipment returning from their vacation in Italy.
- Let Kids Drink – A musical sketch featuring the entire cast (alongside Josh Gad and Al Roker) humorously promoting underage and canine alcohol consumption.
- A "MasterClass: Quarantine Edition" parody ad featuring Chloe Fineman as Phoebe Waller-Bridge and Britney Spears, and Melissa Villaseñor as John Mulaney, promoting courses on their respective professions.
- Mt. Methusela Baptist Church – Kenan Thompson and Chris Redd are a pastor and choir director, respectively, who struggle to conduct Sunday service via Zoom.
- Pete Davidson and Redd star in a music video for their rap about the career of Danny Trejo, with a cameo from Trejo himself at the end.
- Beauty Waves with P. J. Charnt – Wiig portrays P. J. Charnt, a hyperactive beauty YouTuber who gives poor cosmetology advice.
- Michael Che pays tribute to incarcerated mothers and grandmothers who died to COVID-19, before introducing Boyz II Men and Babyface, performing their "A Song for Mama".
- Colin Jost and Che do Weekend Update, again without an audience. Che interviews Tina Fey about the quarantine and Mother's Day. Che reads the winning joke from the last episode's contest, and Jost reads a joke submitted from a "young cancer patient". Jost interviews Jeanine Pirro, portrayed by Cecily Strong.
- What's Wrong with This Picture: Mother's Day Edition – Thompson hosts the recurring game show with Villaseñor, Ego Nwodim, and Aidy Bryant as the mother contestants.
- Eleanor's House – In this parody of Blue's Clues, Elmo's World, and Doc McStuffins, Bryant plays Eleanor, who gradually loses control of her imaginary birthday party during the pandemic after being given a suggestion to have an imaginary one by her goldfish friend Goldie. This imaginary birthday party is attended by Purple Dog (voiced by Bowen Yang), an anthropomorphic ice cream cone (voiced by Bennett), the ice cream cone's friend Richard Carson (voiced by Kyle Mooney), his wife Colleen (voiced by Gardner), and Richard and Colleen's friends from Michigan with one of them named Burger (voiced by Davidson). The out of control imaginary birthday party continues until two police officers (one of them is voiced by Redd while the other one has no dialogue) arrive and break up the party.
- Bitch – Brandon (portrayed by Mikey Day's actual son) pranks his father (Day) for his YouTube channel.
- Kate McKinnon provides tips on getting through shelter-in-place as a parody of Thomas Wake, Willem Dafoe's character in The Lighthouse.
- A still photo of Little Richard, who died earlier that day, is shown in tribute.
- Mooney portrays all the roles in a parody of various young adult-oriented dramedies.
- Dreams – The cast's dreams are shown to be humorous reminiscences of life before the pandemic, set to Clair de lune by Claude Debussy.
- The credits roll over an extended sequence of Wiig trying to go to sleep.
- A cut for time sketch released as an online digital exclusive features Bryant and McKinnon as teenage boys explaining how magical and awkward they would have made prom for their dates in "Messages to the Girls".
- In a second cut for time sketch, Andrea Kremer (Fineman), Steve Kerr (Day), David Aldridge (Redd), and Kim Jong-un (Yang) give interviews in a parody of the ESPN docuseries The Last Dance.
- In a third cut for time sketch, Instagram mommy vlogger Denise (Nwodim) gives an update on how she's handling the stay-at-home order, while hiding from her kids and husband (Thompson) in her closet.

=== Critical reception ===
Writing for The A.V. Club, Dennis Perkins gave the finale a B−, writing that it essentially isn't SNL at all: "Saturday Night Live without the live is dead" and found that while certain sketches such as "Let Kids Drink" and "Dad Prank Video" worked, most of them did not. He also praised the Babyface and Boyz II Men song, urging readers to call their mothers for Mother's Day. Andy Hoglund at Entertainment Weekly singled out Chloe Fineman's impression of Britney Spears as a highlight and said "the self-quarantine has forced the cast to carve out niches of imaginative, lo-fi comedy and ushered in the next generation of talent."

== See also ==
- 2020 in American television
