= Stay Awake: Various Interpretations of Music from Vintage Disney Films =

Compilation album by Various Artists
- Released: October 11, 1988
- Genres: Pop rock, experimental, jazz
- Length: 64:03
- Label: A&M
- Producer: Hal Willner

Hal Willner chronology
| Lost In The Stars: The Music of Kurt Weill (1985) | Stay Awake: Various Interpretations of Music from Vintage Disney Films (1988) | Weird Nightmare: Meditations on Mingus (1992) |

Professional ratings
Review scores
| Source | Rating |
|---|---|
| Allmusic | 4.5/5 stars |
| The New York Times | (favorable) |

Stay Awake: Various Interpretations of Music from Vintage Disney Films is a 1988 tribute album recorded by various artists performing songs from Disney films.

== Production ==
It was produced by Hal Willner, one of the many tribute albums he has done. The album cover features artwork by Rodney Alan Greenblat.

== Reception and legacy ==
The NME ranked it at number 37 in their list of the best albums of 1988. Robert Christgau gave the album a C+. A 20th Anniversary live gala concert, Stay Awake Live, was staged at St. Ann's Warehouse at Brooklyn in 2008 reuniting Terry Adams of NRBQ, Marshall Allen of Sun Ra, Maud and Hudson, Merchant, Vega and Nordine who worked on the original alongside newcomers like actor Steve Buscemi and musicians like David Byrne of Talking Heads.

== Track listing ==
| # | Song name | | Time | Performer |
|---|---|---|---|---|
| 1. | Opening Medley ("I'm Getting Wet and I Don't Care at All") | | | |
| 1. | a) | "Hi Diddle Dee Dee (An Actor's Life For Me)" from Pinocchio | 1:59 | Ken Nordine, with Bill Frisell and Wayne Horvitz |
| 1. | b) | "Little April Shower" from Bambi | 3:32 | Natalie Merchant, Michael Stipe, with Mark Bingham and The Roches |
| 1. | c) | "I Wan'na Be Like You (The Monkey Song)" from The Jungle Book | 3:39 | Los Lobos |
| 2. | "Baby Mine" from Dumbo | | 3:21 | Bonnie Raitt and Was (Not Was) |
| 3. | "Heigh Ho (The Dwarf's Marching Song)" from Snow White and the Seven Dwarfs | | 3:30 | Tom Waits |
| 4. | Medley Two ("The Darkness Sheds Its Veil") | | | |
| 4. | a) | "Stay Awake" from Mary Poppins | 1:48 | Suzanne Vega |
| 4. | b) | "Little Wooden Head" from Pinocchio | 2:10 | Bill Frisell and Wayne Horvitz |
| 4. | c) | "Blue Shadows on the Trail" from Melody Time | 3:50 | Syd Straw |
| 5. | Medley Three ("Three Inches Is Such a Wretched Height") | | | |
| 5. | a) | "Castle in Spain" from Babes in Toyland | 2:37 | Buster Poindexter and The Banshees of Blue |
| 5. | b) | "I Wonder" from Sleeping Beauty | 3:22 | Yma Sumac |
| 6. | "Mickey Mouse March" from The Mickey Mouse Club | | 2:13 | Aaron Neville |
| 7. | Medley Four ("All Innocent Children Had Better Beware") | | | |
| 7. | a) | "Feed the Birds" from Mary Poppins | 4:17 | Garth Hudson |
| 7. | b) | "Whistle While You Work" from Snow White and the Seven Dwarfs | 2:22 | NRBQ |
| 7. | c) | "I'm Wishing" from Snow White and the Seven Dwarfs | 4:20 | Betty Carter |
| 7. | d) | "Cruella De Vil" from 101 Dalmatians | 2:15 | The Replacements |
| 7. | e) | "Dumbo and Timothy" from Dumbo | 2:04 | Bill Frisell and Wayne Horvitz |
| 8. | "Some Day My Prince Will Come" from Snow White and the Seven Dwarfs | | 1:08 | Sinéad O'Connor |
| 9. | Medley Five ("Technicolor Pachyderms") | | | |
| 9. | a) | "Pink Elephants On Parade" from Dumbo | 4:54 | Sun Ra & His Arkestra |
| 9. | b) | "Zip-a-Dee-Doo-Dah" from Song of the South | 3:16 | Harry Nilsson |
| 10. | "Second Star to the Right" from Peter Pan | | 4:02 | James Taylor, with The Roches |
| 11. | Pinocchio Medley ("Do You See The Noses Growing") | | | |
| 11. | a) | "Desolation Theme" from Pinocchio | 2:02 | Ken Nordine, with Bill Frisell and Wayne Horvitz |
| 11. | b) | "When You Wish upon a Star" from Pinocchio | 3:46 | Ringo Starr, with Herb Alpert |

== Personnel ==
| Track | Personnel |
|---|---|
| 1a | Ken Nordine – vocals Bill Frisell – guitars Wayne Horvitz – piano, synthesizers |
| 1b | Natalie Merchant – vocal Michael Stipe – vocal Mark Bingham – banjo The Roches – vocals Lenny Pickett – soprano sax, flute Ralph Carney – clarinet, ocarina, wise spoken words Michael Blair – marimba, percussion, drums Rachel Van Voorhees – harp Jackie Mullen – cello |
| 1c | César Rosas – lead vocal, cuatro David Hidalgo – acoustic nylon string guitar, accordion, background vocals Conrad Lozano – bass Louie Pérez – varrana Steve Berlin – baritone sax Alex Acuna – on percussion |
| 2 | Bonnie Raitt – vocal, slide guitar solo Sweet Pea Atkinson – background vocals Arnold McCuller – background vocals Luis Resto – keyboards Paul Jackson Jr. – guitar Steve Berlin – saxophone Don Was – synthesizer David Was – flute John Patitucci – bass Jim Keltner – drums The Uptown Horns: Crispin Cioe – baritone sax Arno Hecht – tenor sax Bob Funk – trombone "Hollywood" Paul Litteral – trumpet |
| 3 | Tom Waits – vocal Tchad Blake – optigan programming Mitchell Froom – chamberlain Val Kuklowsky – sound effects Marc Ribot – guitars Larry Taylor – bass |
| 4a | Suzanne Vega – vocal |
| 4b | Bill Frisell – guitars, banjo Wayne Horvitz – synthesizers |
| 4c | Syd Straw – vocal Jaydee Mayness – steel guitar Tommy Morgan – harmonica John Jorgenson – guitars, mandolin |
| 5a | Buster Poindexter – vocal Ivy Ray – vocal Brain Koonin – guitar Charles Giordano – piano Tony Garnier – bass Tony Machine – drums Fred Walcott – percussion Jimmy Bralower – drum programming The Uptown Horns: Crispin Cioe – baritone sax Arno Hecht – tenor sax Bob Funk – trombone "Hollywood" Paul Litteral – trumpet |
| 5b | Yma Sumac – vocal Orchestra: Lennie Niehaus – conductor |
| 6 | Aaron Neville – vocal Dr. John (Mac Rebennack) – keyboards Art Neville - background vocal Charles Neville - background vocal Cyril Neville - background vocal |
| 7a | Garth Hudson – keyboards, synthesiszers, accordions Jorge Mirkin – harmonica Jay Rubin – cymbals Steve Deutch – macintosh sequencing/performer software |
| 7b | Terry Adams – keyboards, vocal Joey Spampinato – bass, background vocal Al Anderson – guitars Tom Ardolino – drums, percussion |
| 7c | Betty Carter – vocal Stephen Scott – piano Donald Braden – saxophone Ira Noel Coleman – bass Troy Davis – drums |
| 7d | Paul Westerberg – guitar, vocals Tommy Stinson – bass, background vocals Slim Dunlap – guitar, background vocals Chris Mars – drums Slinkey Rutherford – "pianie" |
| 7e | Bill Frisell - guitars Wayne Horvitz - synthesizers, keyboards |
| 8 | Sinéad O'Connor – vocals Andy Rourke – guitars |
| 9a | Sun Ra – piano Art Jenkins, T.C. III – vocals Bruce Edwards – guitar Pat Patrick – bass Tom Hunter – drums Buster Smith – drums Aveeayl Ra Amen – drums Owen Brown Jr. – violin Vincent Chaucey – French horn John Gilmore – tenor sax Elo Olmo – bass clarinet, alto sax Marshall Allen – flute, alto sax Kenny Williams – baritone sax Fred Adams – trumpet Michael Ray – trumpet Martin Banks – trumpet James Jackson – bassoon |
| 9b | Harry Nilsson – vocal Tom "T-Bone" Wolk – accordion Arto Lindsay – electric guitar Fred Tackett – guitars Dennis Budimir – guitars Peter Scherer – synthesizer Terry Adams – piano Buell Neidlinger – bass Jim Keltner – drums Michael Blair – brushes, frame drum, tambourine, washboard Orchestra: Lennie Niehaus – conductor |
| 10 | James Taylor – vocal, guitar, whistle The Roches – vocals Branford Marsalis – tenor sax Don Grolnick – piano Steve Swallow – bass John Scofield – guitar Mark Bingham – acoustic guitar, humming boy Michael Blair – humming boy too! |
| 11a | Ken Nordine – voice Bill Frisell – guitars Wayne Horvitz – keyboards |
| 11b | Ringo Starr – vocal Herb Alpert – trumpet solo Bill Frisell – electric guitars Fred Tackett – acoustic guitars Dennis Budimir – acoustic guitars Terry Adams – piano Buell Neidlinger – bass Jim Keltner – drums Harry Nilsson – whistle |
