= Byker Hill (album) =

Studio album by Martin Carthy
- Released: 1967
- Genre: Folk
- Label: Fontana, Topic

Martin Carthy chronology
| Second Album (1966) | Byker Hill (1967) | But Two Came By (1968) |

Byker Hill is the third solo album by English folk musician Martin Carthy, originally released in 1967 by Fontana Records and later re-issued by Topic Records. The album features Dave Swarbrick playing fiddle on a number of the tracks.

== Track listing ==
The references after the titles below are from the three major numbering schemes for traditional folk songs, the Roud Folk Song Index, Child Ballad Numbers and the Laws Numbers.
All songs Traditional, arranged by Martin Carthy; except where indicated

| No. | Title | Writer(s) | Length |
|---|---|---|---|
| 1. | "The Man Of Burnham Town" (Roud 665) | | 3.10 |
| 2. | "The Fowler" (Roud 166, Laws 036) | | 3.15 |
| 3. | "Gentleman Soldier" (Roud 178) | | 2.32 |
| 4. | "Brigg Fair" (Roud 1083) | | 1.32 |
| 5. | "The Bloody Gardener" (Roud 1700) | A. L. Lloyd | 3.58 |
| 6. | "The Barley Straw" (Roud 19112) | arranged by Dave Swarbrick and Martin Carthy | 2.32 |
| 7. | "Byker Hill" (Roud 3488) | arranged by Dave Swarbrick | 2.54 |
| 8. | "Davy Lowston" | adapted by A. L. Lloyd | 3.09 |
| 9. | "Our Captain Cried All Hands" (Roud 602) | arranged by Dave Swarbrick | 2.02 |
| 10. | "Domeama" (Roud 511, Laws K40) | | 3.31 |
| 11. | "Wife of the Soldier" | Bertolt Brecht, John Scott | 1.32 |
| 12. | "John Barleycorn" (Roud 164) | arranged by Dave Swarbrick and Martin Carthy | 3.13 |
| 13. | "Lucy Wan" (Roud 234, Child 51) | | 3.55 |
| 14. | "The Bonny Black Hare" (Roud 1656) | | 2.00 |

== Personnel ==
- Martin Carthy – guitar, vocals
- Dave Swarbrick – fiddle

Technical

- Tony Engle – sleeve design
- David Redfern – sleeve photography

== Album information ==
- First released in the UK 1967 by Fontana Records STL5434, 886 441 TY
- Re-issued 1977 by Topic Records 12TS342
- CD issued 1993 by Topic Records TSCD342
