= Stormy Weather: The Music of Harold Arlen =

Compilation album by Various Artists
- Released: February 11, 2003
- Recorded: June 2002
- Genre: Vocal
- Label: Sony
- Producer: Hal Willner

Professional ratings
Review scores
Source	Rating
allmusic	3.5/5 stars

Stormy Weather: The Music of Harold Arlen is a compilation tribute album of Harold Arlen songs, released by Sony in February 2003 as a companion album to the film of the same name. The album was produced by Hal Willner.

== Track listing ==
1. "It's Only a Paper Moon", performed by Rufus Wainwright – 4:44
2. "As Long as I Live", performed by Shannon McNally – 3:32
3. "I Gotta Right to Sing the Blues", performed by Mark Anthony Thompson – 6:08
4. "Stormy Weather / Ill Wind (Medley)", performed by Debbie Harry – 5:20
5. "I Had a Love Once", performed by Jimmy Scott – 2:53
6. "Kickin' the Gong Around", performed by David Johansen – 3:26
7. "Last Night When We Were Young", performed by Harold Arlen – 3:12
8. "I've Got the World on a String", performed by Hawksley Workman & Steve Weisberg – 3:46
9. "Blues in the Night", performed by Mary Margaret O'Hara & Steve Weisberg – 4:44
10. "Minnie the Moocher's Wedding Day", performed by The Boswell Sisters with The Dorsey Brothers Orchestra – 3:06
11. "Get Happy", performed by Eric Mingus – 3:43
12. "Come Rain Or Come Shine", performed by Sandra Bernhard – 3:05
13. "I Wonder What Became of Me", performed by Rufus Wainwright – 3:38
14. "The Man That Got Away", performed by Ranee Lee – 4:05
15. "Ac-Cent-Tchu-Ate the Positive", performed by Steve Bernstein and Mary Margaret O'Hara – 2:54
16. "Over the Rainbow", performed by Jimmy Scott – 2:58
17. "Stormy Weather", performed by Ranee Lee – 4:25

== Personnel ==
- Ray Anderson – trombone
- Harold Arlen – arranger, performer
- Tex Arnold – piano, backing vocalist
- Joe Ascione – drums
- Rick Baptist – trumpet
- Steve Berlin – horn
- Sandra Bernhard – performer
- Steven Bernstein – trumpet, arranger
- Eddie Bert – trombone, backing vocalist
- Chris Bleth – oboe
- The Boswell Sisters – performer
- Greg Cohen – bass, arranger
- Jim Cox – piano
- Cenovia Cummins – violin
- Ian Cuttler – art direction, design
- The Dorsey Brothers – performer
- Andrew Downing – bass
- Tim Emmons – bass
- Peter Erskine – drums
- Lawrence Feldman – clarinet, alto saxophone, backing vocalist
- Simon Fryer – cello
- Sam Furnace – baritone saxophone
- David Gale – trumpet, backing vocalist
- Jack Gale – trombone, arranger, backing vocalist
- Grant Geissman – guitar
- Vince Giordano – bass, backing vocalist
- Sophie Giraud – photography
- Richard Greene – violin
- John Gzowski – guitar
- Debbie Harry – performer
- David Hidalgo – accordion
- Dan Higgins – saxophone
- Viliam Hrubovcak – photography
- Greg Huckins – saxophone
- Fujice Imajishi – violin
- Scott Irvine – tuba
- David Johansen – performer
- John "Woog" Johnson – clarinet, tenor saxophone
- Alastair Kay – trombone
- Peter Kent – concert master
- Arnie Kinsella – drums, backing vocalist
- Brian Koonin – banjo, guitar, arranger, backing vocalist
- Ron Lawrence – viola
- Emily Lazar – mastering
- Ranee Lee – performer
- J.T. Lewis – drums
- Eric Liljestrand – engineer, mixing
- John MacLeod – trumpet
- Rusty McCarthy – guitar
- Shannon McNally – performer
- Michael Melvoin – piano
- Eric Mingus – performer
- Maxim Moston – violin
- Roy Nathanson – arranger, alto saxophone
- Milton Nelson – orchestration
- Mary Margaret O'Hara – arranger, performer
- Earl Palmer – drums
- Van Dyke Parks – arranger, conductor
- Mark Pender – trumpet, backing vocalist
- Bucky Pizzarelli – guitar
- Mark Promane – flute, alto saxophone
- Jon Regen – arranger, keyboards
- Sarah Register – assistant mastering engineer
- Gerald Robinson – bassoon
- Jay Rodriguez – tenor saxophone
- Adam Rogers – guitar
- John Rosenberg – music contractor
- Jane Scarpantoni – arranger, conductor
- Terrence Schonig – percussion
- Little Jimmy Scott – performer
- Lee Sklar – bass
- Roxanne Slimak – art direction, design
- Michael Sloski – drums
- James Spragg – trumpet
- Edmund Stein – violin
- Rob Thomas – violin
- Ernie Tollar – flute, alto saxophone
- Jerry Vivino – clarinet, tenor saxophone, backing vocalist
- Rufus Wainwright – arranger, performer
- Larry Weinstein – liner notes
- Steve Weisberg – arranger, conductor
- Perry White – flute, baritone saxophone, tenor saxophone
- Sharon Williams – choir master
- Hal Willner – producer, liner notes
- Chuck Wilson – alto saxophone, backing vocalist
- Hawksley Workman – performer
- Maurice Wozniak – euphonium
- Garo Yellin – cello
