= Richard Woitach =

American conductor, pianist, and composer (1935–2020)

Richard Woitach (July 27, 1935 – October 3, 2020) was an American conductor, pianist, and composer. In 1959, after studying music at the Eastman School of Music, Woitach jointed the Metropolitan Opera in New York City and served as a staff conductor there until 1997. In 1981, he collaborated with Canadian operatic soprano Teresa Stratas to record The Unknown Kurt Weill, a landmark Nonesuch record that introduced unpublished songs of German composer Kurt Weill and for which Woitach received a Grammy nomination in 1982. Woitach also was a long time collaborator with Canadian heldentenor Jon Vickers, accompanying him on the piano in several recorded recitals in both Canada and New York City. Woitach was survived by his wife soprano Jeryl Metz, his children and grandchildren.

At the Metropolitan Opera he first led, on tour, John Dexter's production of Les vêpres siciliennes (with Cristina Deutekom, Cornell MacNeil, and Paul Plishka, 1974), then conducted in the House, Madama Butterfly (with Harry Theyard, 1974), La Gioconda, Tosca, Le siège de Corinthe (with Beverly Sills and Shirley Verrett, 1976), Lucia di Lammermoor (with Miss Sills), Tosca (Sylvia Sass's Met debut, 1977), La traviata (Maria Chiara's Met debut, 1977), Cavalleria rusticana, Pagliacci (with Vickers, 1978), Don Pasquale (with Jon Garrison, 1979), Hänsel und Gretel (with Tatiana Troyanos, Judith Blegen, and Michael Devlin, 1981), La bohème, Fidelio, Bluebeard's Castle (with Devlin and Jessye Norman), Eugene Onegin (with Mirella Freni), Così fan tutte, Boris Godounov, Die Zauberflöte, Die Entführung aus dem Serail, and, finally, Elektra, (1994). Woitach also led a production of Argento's Postcard from Morocco, at Wolf Trap, with Phyllis Treigle in the cast.

From 1976 to 1978, he conducted the Naumburg Orchestral Concerts, in the Naumburg Bandshell, Central Park, in the summer series.
