= Spanish Fly (band) =

Spanish Fly is an avant garde jazz trio from New York City. It consists of Steven Bernstein (trumpet), David Tronzo (guitar), and Marcus Rojas (tuba). Participation in other projects have limited the releases of this band. The group's first album, Fly By Night, was produced by Hal Willner, who wrote in the album's liner notes that the group's early 1990s live performances at the Knitting Factory had the same kind of impact on him as those of Miles Davis and Tim Buckley in the 1970s.

== Discography ==
- Fly by Night - 1994 on Accurate Records
- Rags to Britches [live] - 1994 on Knitting Factory Records
