= Hal Willner =

American record producer (1956–2020)

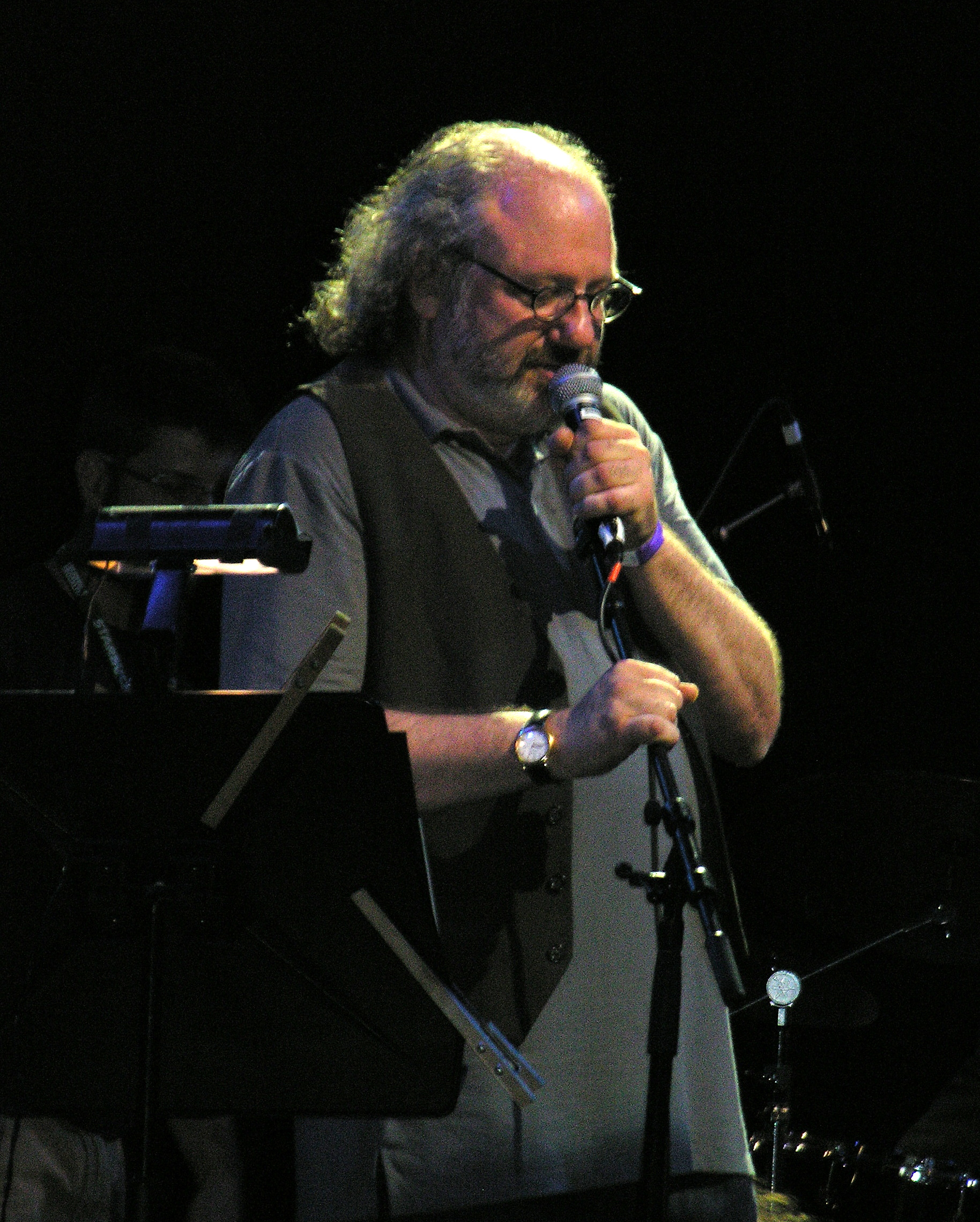
- Willner in 2007
- Born: April 6, 1956; Philadelphia, Pennsylvania, U.S.
- Died: April 7, 2020 (aged 64); New York City, New York, U.S.
- Occupation: Music producer
- Years active: 1970s–2020
- Spouse: Sheila Rogers
- Children: 1

Hal Willner (April 6, 1956 – April 7, 2020) was an American music producer working in recording, films, television, and live events. He was the longtime music coordinator of Saturday Night Live, was also known for assembling tribute albums and events featuring a wide variety of artists and musical styles (jazz, classical, rock, Tin Pan Alley). Willner died during the COVID-19 pandemic from complications brought on by the virus.

== Early life ==
Willner was born in Philadelphia in 1956. His father and uncle were Holocaust survivors. Willner moved to New York City in 1974 to attend New York University, but did not graduate.

== Career ==
In the late 1970s, Willner worked under record producer Joel Dorn, credited as associate producer on Leon Redbone's albums Double Time and Champagne Charlie, and The Neville Brothers' Fiyo on the Bayou. In 1980, Willner became the sketch music producer of Saturday Night Live, where he chose the music to be used in sketches. Willner held this job until his death in 2020. From 1988 to 1990 he produced the TV program Sunday Night (later renamed Night Music), which was hosted by David Sanborn and presented musicians from a wide variety of genres.

Willner produced albums for Marianne Faithfull, Lou Reed, Bill Frisell, Steven Bernstein, William S. Burroughs, Gavin Friday, Lucinda Williams, Laurie Anderson, and Allen Ginsberg, among others. In 1991, he produced a live tribute concert to Tim Buckley, a show that gave important exposure to Buckley's son Jeff 18 months before Jeff Buckley signed with a record label. In 1998, Willner released his only album as a featured artist, Whoops, I'm an Indian. The album mixed drum and bass and ambient music recordings with audio samples, including many sourced from 78 rpm records from the early-mid 20th century.

Following earlier stagings, in January 2010 Willner produced his pirate-themed concert event Rogue's Gallery for the Sydney Festival. The multinational cast included Marianne Faithfull, Todd Rundgren, Tim Robbins, Richard Strange, Gavin Friday, Anohni, Peter Garrett, Baby Gramps, David Thomas, Sarah Blasko, Katy Steele, Peaches, Glenn Richards, Liam Finn, Camille O'Sullivan, Kami Thompson, and Marry Waterson.

== Personal life ==
Willner married television producer Sheila Rogers. In November, 2004, their son Arlo was born.

=== Death ===
Willner had symptoms consistent with COVID-19. He died at his home on the Upper West Side of Manhattan on April 7, 2020, one day after his 64th birthday during the pandemic in New York City. A tribute to Willner was played during the April 11, 2020 episode of Saturday Night Live, featuring both the reminiscences of current and past cast members and a choral rendition of Lou Reed's song "Perfect Day".

On 3 April, 2026, U2 released "Song for Hal" as part of their Easter Lily EP. The song was written as a tribute to Willner after his death in the early stages of the Covid pandemic.

== Productions ==
=== Concept albums produced by Hal Willner ===
- Amarcord Nino Rota (1981) Willner's first tribute album salutes Italian composer Nino Rota, and features interpretation of his music for Federico Fellini films by jazz musicians including: Wynton and Branford Marsalis; Carla Bley; Muhal Richard Abrams; Bill Frisell; Steve Lacy; and Jaki Byard; plus singer–songwriter Deborah Harry.
- That's The Way I Feel Now: A Tribute to Thelonious Monk (1984) features pop and jazz musicians including NRBQ, Steve Lacy, Dr. John, John Zorn, Donald Fagen, and Peter Frampton.
- Lost in the Stars: The Music of Kurt Weill (1985) features musicians ranging from Sting to Charlie Haden
- Stay Awake: Various Interpretations of Music from Vintage Disney Films (1988) features performances of songs from Walt Disney movies by a large cast of artists ranging from Sun Ra to NRBQ, Michael Stipe, Ringo Starr, Yma Sumac and Ken Nordine
- Weird Nightmare: Meditations on Mingus (1992) is a tribute to Charles Mingus, featuring instruments designed and built by American composer Harry Partch, on loan from his estate. Performers include Bill Frisell, Vernon Reid, Henry Rollins, Keith Richards, Charlie Watts, Don Byron, Henry Threadgill, Gary Lucas, Bobby Previte, Robert Quine, Leonard Cohen, Diamanda Galás, Chuck D, Francis Thumm, and Elvis Costello
- September Songs: The Music of Kurt Weill (1994) re-creation of the previous Weill tribute as a Canadian TV special directed by Larry Weinstein. A CD was issued including performances by Nick Cave and PJ Harvey. The list of performers on this recording is different from the list of performers on his previous Weill tribute. Some of those that are on both tributes, such as Lou Reed and Charlie Haden, provide new recordings of the pieces they contributed previously. Many of the songs included are the same, although the new recording tends toward more historical recordings (Lotte Lenya, Bertolt Brecht, and Weill himself), while the previous one tended toward more avant-garde tributes.
- Stormy Weather: The Music of Harold Arlen (2003) another Larry Weinstein TV program. The CD includes performances by Rufus Wainwright, Debbie Harry, David Johansen, Eric Mingus and Sandra Bernhard
- Leonard Cohen: I'm Your Man (2006) soundtrack for Lian Lunson's documentary film about Willner's Leonard Cohen tribute event Came So Far for Beauty
- Rogue's Gallery: Pirate Ballads, Sea Songs, and Chanteys (2006) Double CD includes performers ranging from Bono to Van Dyke Parks.
- The Harry Smith Project: Anthology of American Folk Music Revisited (2006). Recorded at Hal Willner's Harry Smith Project events in London (1999), Brooklyn (1999) and LA (2001), plus a DVD documentary.
- Son of Rogues Gallery: Pirate Ballads, Sea Songs & Chanteys (2013) is a compilation album of sea shanties and the follow-up to 2006's Rogue's Gallery.
- Will Anybody Know That I Was Here: The Songs of Beulah Rowley (2016). A concept album about a Depression-era singer/songwriter, written and performed by Mary Lee Kortes, produced by Hal Willner, recorded at John Kilgore Sound & Recording. This was Willner's last single-artist album. Special guests include Joe Jackson, Lenny Pickett, Eric "Roscoe" Ambel, Charlie Burnham, Doug Weiselman, Shawn Pelton.
- AngelHeaded Hipster : The Songs of Marc Bolan & T. Rex (2020) is a compilation album that pays tribute to Marc Bolan and his group T. Rex. Willner relates in the notes to the album that he was a fan of Bolan since the 1970s. Decades later, BMG approached Willner to produce a tribute album to Marc as a composer, and AngelHeaded Hipster is the result. The double CD and vinyl album includes performances by Kesha, Nick Cave, Joan Jett, Devendra Banhart, Lucinda Williams, Peaches, BORNS, Beth Orton, King Khan, Gaby Moreno, U2 and Elton John, John Cameron Mitchell, Emily Haines, Father John Misty, Perry Farrell, Elysian Fields, Gavin Friday, Nena, Marc Almond, Helga Davis, Todd Rundgren, Jesse Harris, Sean Lennon and Charlotte Kemp Muhl, Victoria Williams and Julian Lennon, David Johanson, and Maria McKee, with vocal contributions from Richard Barone, Jenni Muldaur, and Rolan Bolan. The album was released in September 2020, following Willner's death.

=== Themed concerts produced by Hal Willner ===
- Greetings from Tim Buckley (Brooklyn 1991)
- Nevermore: Poems & Stories of Edgar Allan Poe (Brooklyn 1995), which led to the album Closed on Account of Rabies (1997), then Hal Willner's Halloween Show: Never Bet the Devil your Head (Los Angeles 2002), then Closed on Account of Rabies: Poems and Tales of Edgar Allan Poe (Los Angeles 2001)
- Tribute to Allen Ginsberg (Los Angeles)
- Marquis de Sade's writings (New York 1998)
- The Harry Smith Project (London 1999, Los Angeles 2001)
- The Doc Pomus Project (New York City 2001)
- Came So Far for Beauty, An Evening of Songs by Leonard Cohen (Brooklyn 2003, Brighton 2004, Sydney 2005, Dublin 2006)
- Dream Comfort Memory Despair: The Songs of Neil Young (Brooklyn 2004), followed by Hal Willner's Neil Young Project (Vancouver 2010)
- Perfect Partners: Nino Rota & Federico Fellini (London 2004)
- Shock and Awe: The Songs of Randy Newman (Los Angeles 2004)
- Let's Eat: Feasting on The Firesign Theatre (Los Angeles 2004)
- Forest of No Return: Hal Willner Presents Vintage Disney Songbook (London 2007), followed by Stay Awake: 20th anniversary of the classic recording of Disney songs (Brooklyn 2008) (Hal Willner's Stay Awake at UCLA was scheduled for October 30, 2008, but was cancelled due to unavailability of some performers)
- Rogue's Gallery (NYC 2007, Dublin 2008, London 2008, Gateshead 2008, Sydney 2010)
- Hal Willner's Bill Withers Project (Brooklyn 2008)
- Begats: Readings of the Work of Burroughs, DeSade & Poe (Brooklyn 2009)
- Gotta Right to Sing the Blues? Music and Readings from A Fine Romance, Jewish Songwriters, American Songs (NYC 2010)
- An Evening with Gavin Friday and Friends (New York, Carnegie Hall, 2009)
- Hal Willner's Freedom Riders Project (Brooklyn 2011)
- Shelebration: The Works of Shel Silverstein (New York 2011)
- Hal Willner’s Amarcord Nino Rota (London, The Barbican, 2013; New York, Lincoln Center, 2018)
- The Bells: A Day Long Celebration of Lou Reed (New York, July 30, 2016)
- 'Tomorrow Is A Long Time: Songs from Bob Dylan's 1963 Town Hall Concert' (New York Town Hall Thursday, May 24, 2018)

=== Spoken word recordings ===
With the increasing prevalence of tribute albums in the late 1980s (such as Red Hot + Blue), Willner decided to turn his attention to spoken word recordings.

- Dead City Radio (1990) by William Burroughs has musical backing by Sonic Youth, Donald Fagen, John Cale and others.
- Spare Ass Annie and Other Tales (1996) by William Burroughs with music by The Disposable Heroes of Hiphoprisy.
- The Lion for Real by Allen Ginsberg (Mouth Almighty Records 1989) features musical accompaniment by Bill Frisell, Philip Glass, Paul McCartney and others.
- Closed on Account of Rabies (Mouth Almighty Records 1997) consists of readings of Edgar Allan Poe poems and tales by Iggy Pop and others. As Willner's only "spoken word" tribute album, it fits in the context of his other music-based tributes.
- In with the Out Crowd (Mouth Almighty Records 1998) by poet Bob Holman.
- Let the Buyer Beware (2004) is an authoritative six CD box set of historic recordings by the comedian Lenny Bruce.
- The Kentucky Derby is Decadent and Depraved starring Tim Robbins as Hunter S. Thompson, delivering an inspired read of the legendary 1970 sports article for Scanlan's Monthly, which is widely credited as the origin of 'Gonzo Journalism'. Co-starring Ralph Steadman, as himself, with musical accompaniment by Bill Frisell

=== Film-related projects ===
- The Carl Stalling Project: Two CDs of music composed and/or arranged by Carl Stalling for Warner Brothers cartoons. The first CD was released in 1990; "Volume 2" was released in 1995.
- The soundtracks to Robert Altman's films Short Cuts (1993) and Kansas City (1996).
- Music Supervisor or Producer for The Million Dollar Hotel (Dir. Wim Wenders, 2000), Finding Forester (Dir. Gus Van Sant, 2000), Gangs of New York (Dir. Martin Scorsese, 2002), Talladega Nights (Dir. Adam McKay, 2006), and others.
