= September Song =

1938 song by Kurt Weill and Maxwell Anderson

Single by Walter Huston
- B-side: The Scars
- Published: September 24, 1938 by Crawford Music Corp., New York
- Released: December 1938
- Recorded: November 14, 1938
- Studio: Columbia Records, 1776 Broadway, New York
- Genre: Popular music, musical theatre
- Length: 2:51
- Label: Brunswick 8272
- Composer: Kurt Weill
- Lyricist: Maxwell Anderson

"September Song" is an American standard popular song composed by Kurt Weill with lyrics by Maxwell Anderson. It was introduced by Walter Huston in the 1938 Broadway musical production Knickerbocker Holiday. The song has been recorded by numerous singers and instrumentalists.

== Origins ==
The song originated from Walter Huston's request that he should have one solo song in Knickerbocker Holiday if he were to play the role of the aged governor of New Netherland, Peter Stuyvesant. Anderson and Weill wrote the song in a couple of hours for Huston's gruff voice and limited vocal range.

Knickerbocker Holiday was roughly based on Washington Irving's Knickerbocker's History of New York set in New Amsterdam in 1647. It is a political allegory criticizing the policies of the New Deal through the portrayal of a semi–fascist government of New Amsterdam, with a corrupt governor and councilmen. It also involves a love triangle with a young woman forced to marry the governor Peter Stuyvesant while loving another. The musical closed in April 1939 after a six-month run.

== Lyric content ==
In "September Song", a man now recognizes the "plentiful waste of time" of earlier days, and in the "long, long while from May to December", having reached September, he is looking forward to spending the precious days of autumn with his loved one.

== Covers ==
Frank Sinatra's 1946 version, in an arrangement by Axel Stordahl, reached No. 8 on the Billboard charts that year. He went on to re-record the song twice: in the 1962 album Point of No Return again arranged by Stordahl, and three years later, on the 1965 album September of My Years, arranged by Gordon Jenkins.

Ian McCulloch of Echo & the Bunnymen released a version as his debut solo single (backed with a rendition of "Molly Malone") which reached number 51 on the UK Singles Chart in 1984.

In 2012, Anjelica Huston, the granddaughter of original singer Walter Huston, sang the song in the season one episode of Smash.

== See also ==
- List of 1930s jazz standards
