= Knickerbocker Holiday =

1938 musical

- Windowcard for the original Broadway production
- Music: Kurt Weill
- Lyrics: Maxwell Anderson
- Book: Maxwell Anderson
- Basis: Washington Irving's; Father Knickerbocker's Stories
- Productions: 1938 – 1939 Broadway; 1944 Film

Knickerbocker Holiday is a 1938 musical written by Kurt Weill (music) and Maxwell Anderson (book and lyrics), based loosely on Washington Irving's Knickerbocker's History of New York about life in 17th-century New Netherland (old New York). The musical numbers include "September Song", now considered a pop standard.

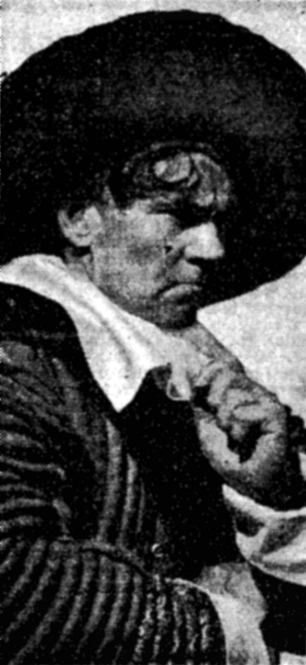
Walter Huston as Peter Stuyvesant in Knickerbocker Holiday

The musical is set in 1647 Manhattan, at the time of the arrival of Peter Stuyvesant, the new Director-General of New Netherland. The local politician Tienhoven is selling brandy and firearms to the Indians, and his prospective son-in-law Brom Broeck is aware of his political corruption. Tienhoven arranges for Broeck to be executed by hanging, but Stuyvesant pardons the young man. Broeck and his new patron are both planning to marry the same woman.

== Plot summary ==
The action is narrated by 19th-century author Washington Irving, who announces his intent to write a history of the original Dutch settlement of New Amsterdam. The story opens in Manhattan in 1647, where the colony awaits the arrival of its new Governor from Holland, Peter Stuyvesant. Irving selects the young Brom Broeck as his hero. Broeck is a brave but impulsive fellow who becomes enraged if anyone tries to give him orders. The narrator and his character reflect that this independent streak is characteristic of American citizens.

Brom is in love with Tina Tienhoven, whose father heads the corrupt town council. Brom knows that Tienhoven is selling brandy and firearms to the Indians—a criminal offense. Tienhoven, with the support of his cronies, arranges to have Brom convicted and hanged. Brom survives by putting the noose around his waist instead of his neck just as Stuyvesant arrives on the scene. Impressed by the young man's ingenuity, the Governor pardons him.

Stuyvesant plans to marry Tina and to declare war as his first official act of governance. After many mishaps and recriminations, all ends happily when the narrator reminds Stuyvesant that history will not remember him kindly if he persists in his dictatorial actions. Brom and Tina are free to marry, and the musical ends as Stuyvesant reflects that perhaps he will make a good American, given his own independence and resistance to authority.

== Historical context ==
Knickerbocker Holiday is both a romantic comedy and a thinly veiled allegory equating the New Deal of Franklin D. Roosevelt with fascism. (A Roosevelt ancestor is one of the characters on the corrupt New Amsterdam council in the play.) Playwright Anderson believed that government was necessary in society, but that it must always be watched because it is swayed by the self-interests of those in power. He saw FDR's New Deal as an American version of the corporatism and concentration of political power which had given rise to Nazism and Stalinism.

== Productions ==
The musical premiered on Broadway at the Ethel Barrymore Theatre on October 19, 1938 and closed on March 11, 1939 after 168 performances. It was produced by the Playwrights' Company and directed by Joshua Logan. The original production starred Walter Huston (as Peter Stuyvesant), Richard Kollmar (as Brom Broeck), Jeanne Madden (as Tina), Ray Middleton (as Washington Irving), and Mark Smith (as Tienhoven). Burgess Meredith, a friend of Weill's, was originally set to play the romantic young lead Brom Broek, but he left when he saw the villainous Peter Stuyvesant character growing into a more and more lovable and important role, upstaging his.

Burt Lancaster starred in a revival production presented by the Los Angeles Civic Light Opera at the Dorothy Chandler Pavilion at the Music Center, L.A in June, 1971. The cast also included Anita Gillette, David Holliday and Jack Collins.

The musical premiered in Germany on September 25, 1976, at the Thalia Theater in Hamburg.

In 1977, concert performances with reduced orchestration were presented in New York City's Town Hall. Richard Kiley starred.

Light Opera Works of Evanston, IL mounted a revival of the work in December 1992 with artistic direction by Philip Kraus, stage direction by Seth Reines and conducted by Peter Lipari.

Knickerbocker Holiday made its Canadian premiere on February 20, 2009 at the Jane Mallet Theatre, St. Lawrence Centre for the Arts in Toronto, Ontario. It was produced by the Toronto Operetta Theatre, under the direction of Guillermo Silva-Marin. This production featured Curtis Sullivan as Washington Irving, Dale Miller as Brom Broeck, Amy Wallis as Tina Tienhoven, David Ludwig as Governor Peter Stuyvesant and Rejean Cournoyer as Roosevelt. It also featured Jeffrey Sanders as Schermerhorn, Greg Finney as Vanderbilt and Ford Roberts as Mr. Tienhoven. It was directed by Guillermo Silva-Marin, musically directed and conducted by David Speers, and featured the TOT Orchestra and vocal ensemble.

In June 2009, Knickerbocker Holiday was presented by York Theatre's Musicals in Mufti in a staged concert. Directed by Michael Unger, the cast featured Josh Grisetti as Washington Irving, Nick Gaswirth as Brom, Kelli Barrett as Tina, Martin Vidnovic as Stuyvesant, William Parry as Roosevelt, and Walter Charles as Tienhoven.

The Collegiate Chorale at Alice Tully Hall, New York City, presented a concert version on January 25–26, 2011, with Kelli O'Hara, Victor Garber, Christopher Fitzgerald, Ben Davis, Bryce Pinkham and David Garrison, and the American Symphony Orchestra and a chorus of 65. A recording of this performance was released on CD in June 2011 by Sh-k-boom Records.

== Film version ==
The 1944 film version, written by Thomas L. Lennon, starring Nelson Eddy as Broeck, Constance Dowling as Tina, and Charles Coburn as Stuyvesant, not only removed most of the songs and added new ones not by Weill and Anderson, but watered down the political allegory considerably, having been released during World War II.

== Television use of "September Song" ==
In "Previews," Season 1/Episode 14 of the TV series Smash, the character of producer Eileen Rand sings a version of "September Song." Anjelica Huston, who played Eileen Rand, is the granddaughter of Walter Huston, who introduced the song in the original production of Knickerbocker Holiday. "September Song" was also mentioned and sang in the last episode of season 3 of the TV show Elsbeth.

== Songs ==
=== Act I ===
- "Clackety-Clack" – Washington Irving and Girls
- "It's a Law" – Tienhoven and Council
- "There's Nowhere to Go But Up" – Brom Broeck, Tenpin and Ensemble
- "It Never Was You" – Brom Broeck and Tina Tienhoven
- "How Can You Tell an American?" – Brom Broeck and Washington Irving
- "Will You Remember Me?" – Brom Broeck, Tina Tienhoven and Ensemble
- "One Touch of Alchemy" – Pieter Stuyvesant and Ensemble
- "The One Indispensable Man" – Pieter Stuyvesant and Tienhoven
- "Young People Think About Love" – Tienhoven, Brom Broeck and Ensemble
- "September Song" – Pieter Stuyvesant

=== Act II ===
- "Ballad of the Robbers" – Washington Irving
- "We Are Cut in Twain" – Brom Broeck and Tina Tienhoven
- "There's Nowhere to Go But Up (Reprise)" – Washington Irving
- "To War!" – Pieter Stuyvesant, Council and Male Ensemble
- "Our Ancient Liberties" – Tienhoven, Anthony Corlear and Council
- "Romance and Musketeer" – Ensemble
- "The Scars" – Pieter Stuyvesant and Ensemble
- "Dirge for a Soldier" – Ensemble
- "Ve Vouldn't Gonto Do It" – Ensemble
