= The Early Years (album series) =

Compilation album series by Tom Waits
- Released: Volume One - July 16, 1991; Volume Two - January 19, 1993
- Recorded: July–December 1971
- Genre: Rock
- Length: 43:35 & 44:11
- Label: Manifesto
- Producer: Robert Duffey

Volume Two

Professional ratings
Review scores
Source	Rating
Allmusic	(Volume One) link
Allmusic	(Volume Two) link

The Early Years is a two-part retrospective album series of Tom Waits songs, consisting of recordings made before Waits' debut album, Closing Time. Volume one was released in 1991 and volume two was released in 1993 on Bizarre/Straight. The recordings were made between July and December 1971. Some of the songs on the album appear on the early albums Waits recorded for Asylum Records. In 2010, both volumes of The Early Years were released on vinyl by Manifesto Records.

== Volume One ==
All tracks composed by Tom Waits.

No.	Title	Re-recording release	Length
1.	"Goin' Down Slow"		2:48
2.	"Poncho's Lament"		4:17
3.	"I'm Your Late Night Evening Prostitute"		3:16
4.	"Had Me a Girl"		5:32
5.	"Ice Cream Man"	Closing Time, 1973	3:11
6.	"Rockin' Chair"		3:15
7.	"Virginia Ave."	Closing Time	2:41
8.	"Midnight Lullaby"	Closing Time	3:26
9.	"When You Ain't Got Nobody"		3:23
10.	"Little Trip to Heaven"	Closing Time	3:02
11.	"Frank's Song"		1:56
12.	"Looks Like I'm Up Shit Creek Again"		3:03
13.	"So Long I'll See Ya"		3:30

== Volume Two ==
All tracks composed by Tom Waits.

No.	Title	Re-recording release	Length
1.	"Hope I Don't Fall in Love with You"	Closing Time	5:01
2.	"Ol' '55"	Closing Time	4:07
3.	"Mockin' Bird"		3:27
4.	"In Between Love"		3:01
5.	"Blue Skies"	non-album single, 1974	2:13
6.	"Nobody"	Nighthawks at the Diner, 1975	2:47
7.	"I Want You"		1:22
8.	"Shiver Me Timbers"	The Heart of Saturday Night, 1974	3:48
9.	"Grapefruit Moon"	Closing Time	4:36
10.	"Diamonds on My Windshield"	The Heart of Saturday Night	3:10
11.	"Please Call Me, Baby"	The Heart of Saturday Night	3:43
12.	"So It Goes"		2:31
13.	"Old Shoes"	Closing Time	4:24

- "Ice Cream Man", "Virginia Avenue", "Midnight Lullaby", "Little Trip to Heaven", "Hope I Don't Fall in Love with You", "Grapefruit Moon", "Ol' '55" and "Old Shoes" (as '"Old Shoes (& Picture Postcards)") were re-recorded on Closing Time.
- "Shiver Me Timbers", "Please Call Me, Baby" and "Diamonds on My Windshield" re-recorded on The Heart of Saturday Night.
- "Blue Skies" was re-recorded and released as a stand-alone single in October 1974.
- "Nobody" was re-recorded for Nighthawks at the Diner.
