= Tropicana Motel =

West Hollywood motel & music scene hub

The Tropicana Motel
- The Tropicana Motel, with Duke's Coffee Shop visible under its sign

General information
- Status: Demolished
- Type: Motel
- Location: 8585 Santa Monica Boulevard, West Hollywood, California, United States
- Coordinates: 34.0888°N 118.3782°W
- Opened: 1947
- Closed: 1987

The Tropicana Motel was a motel located at 8585 Santa Monica Boulevard in West Hollywood, California. Also called "The Trop", it opened in 1947 and closed in 1987. It was a hub from the mid/late 60s for musicians and artists due to cheap room rates and proximity to both recording studios and Sunset Strip drinking venues. The Trop has been described as "the palm-trees-and-Astroturf answer to New York's Chelsea Hotel."

== Ownership ==
The late 1940s-constructed building was bought by Los Angeles Dodgers star pitcher Sandy Koufax in 1962. He was the fourth owner. The motel supplemented his baseball salary during the offseason.

Jerry Heiner and his partners then purchased The Trop in the late 60s.

== Design, features and amenities ==
The earliest building permit for the site is dated July 1946. It lists the value of the two-story, 59-unit motel to be constructed as $95,000. Koufax later advertised "74 luxurious air-conditioned rooms" at "popular prices". The motel had a horseshoe shape.

The Tropicana's pool was kidney bean-shaped, later painted black "probably so they don't have to clean it so often."

The Trop was located near the end of Route 66 and was originally a stopover for travelling salesmen from the midwest. However, its most famous clients were working rock bands, increasingly after Elektra Sound Recorders opened nearby in January 1968. Inexpensive pricing ($29.75 a night if guests stayed the week) made the Tropicana affordable. A number of struggling bands lived in their cars in the motel's back parking lot (which the management was fully aware of). Another attraction of the Trop was proximity to Sunset Strip venues such as The Troubador and Barney's Beanery.

Photographer Brad Elterman said, "There was a lot of really good energy there. It had an interesting garden courtyard layout—no long dark hallways to get to your room... There was one payphone booth and everyone worked it for incoming and outgoing calls. It was like an office." William S. Burroughs wrote in Rolling Stone in 1980, "On the patio are rusty metal tables, deck chairs, palms and banana trees: a rundown Raymond Chandler set from the 1950s. One expects to find a dead man floating in the pool one morning."

In 1968, the original Duke's Coffee Shop opened as the Tropicana's resident eatery. With the Tropicana's scheduled demolition, Duke's relocated in late 1986 to 8909 Sunset Boulevard.

== Notable guests ==
- The Alarm
- The Beach Boys
- Black Flag
- Blondie
- Lindsey Buckingham and Stevie Nicks later of Fleetwood Mac reportedly landed their recording contact for Buckingham Nicks in 1973 while staying at the motel.
- William S. Burroughs
- The Clash
- Alice Cooper
- The Cramps
- Joe Dallesandro
- Dead Boys
- The Dickies
- The Doors - Jim Morrison lived at the Trop for three years during his glory days with the Doors. He then relocated around the corner to the Alta Cinega Motel. The Doors often breakfasted at Dukes, with the Doors' workshop nearby. The group recorded its last album with Morrison, L.A. Woman, at its studio right across Santa Monica Boulevard from the motel.
- Brad Elterman
- Faith No More stayed at the motel while recording Introduce Yourself at Ground Control Studios.
- The Germs
- Richard Hell
- The Jackson 5
- Rickie Lee Jones is said to have written "Chuck E's in Love" at the Trop on Tom Wait's piano.
- Janis Joplin
- Led Zeppelin
- Jenny Lens
- The Mamas & the Papas
- Bob Marley
- Martha and the Vandellas
- Roger McGuinn
- Van Morrison wrote "T.B. Sheets" and several other songs while staying at the Tropicana.
- New York Dolls
- Orchestral Manoeuvres in the Dark
- Tom Petty and the Heartbreakers
- Poison
- Ramones - The band stayed at the trop while filming Rock 'n' Roll High School. Linda Danielle later claims that she and Joey Ramone fell in love in the Tropicana's car park when the band were in LA recording End of the Century. The band set up camp at the Trop on 1 May 1979 for the recording. The song "Danny Says" on the album references the room Joey was sharing with Arturo Vega; "Hanging out in 100b, watching Get Smart on tv." Danielle is believed to be the subject of Joey's affection in the song. She later left Joey to begin a relationship with and eventually marry band guitarist Johnny Ramone. She has been known since as Linda Ramone.
- Rockpile recorded the promo video here for their Nick Lowe fronted single, "Cruel to Be Kind".
- The Runaways
- The Screamers
- The Slits
- Patti Smith
- Bruce Springsteen
- Sly Stone
- The Stooges recorded Fun House at Elektra Sound Recorders in May 1970.
- Tom Waits is reported in one article to have lived there from 1975 to 1979, positioning his piano in his kitchen. Waits has been reported to have "enlarged" the door without permission to move in his piano, and similarly "sawing off the draining board" to accommodate his Steinway. Another article quotes an interview with Waits in which is he is alleged to remark, "whole like nine years I was there."
- Andy Warhol
- Chuck E. Weiss
- Frank Zappa
- Warren Zevon lived here after being thrown out of the house by his wife.

== Closure and demolition ==
The property was purchased by a partnership headed by developer Yehuda Naftali. The motel finally closed in late September 1987 after Naftali won permission from West Hollywood to construct a $20-million complex of motel rooms and retail shops. Demolition began in October 1987 to replace the motel with a 178-unit Ramada Inn. "I think it's a shame. I think they should have gone and got it made a historic landmark, or something, 'cause it was," said Richard Miller, Duke's maitre d’hotel.
