= (Looking for) The Heart of Saturday Night =

Song by Tom Waits

from the album The Heart of Saturday Night
- Released: 1974
- Studio: Wally Heider's Studio 3 (Hollywood)
- Genre: Jazz, blues, folk
- Length: 3:50
- Label: Asylum
- Songwriter(s): Tom Waits
- Producer(s): Bones Howe

"(Looking for) The Heart of Saturday Night" is a song by Tom Waits on his 1974 album The Heart of Saturday Night.

== Background ==
After completing the album Closing Time, Waits toured with Frank Zappa. At this period, Waits started to write and compose the album The Heart of Saturday Night, basing it around the writing style and thematic elements of Jack Kerouac. The song itself is a melancholy reflection of exploring the city streets at night.

== Cover versions ==
"(Looking for) The Heart of Saturday Night" has been covered by such musicians as Dion, Holly Cole, Shawn Colvin, and Madeleine Peyroux.

== Personnel ==
Listed personnel cited from liner notes:

- Tom Waits – vocals, guitar
- Jim Hughart – double bass
- Jim Gordon – body percussion
