= Boots on the Ground (Massive Attack song) =

Single by Massive Attack and Tom Waits
- B-side: "The Fly"
- Released: 16 April 2026
- Genre: Protest song
- Length: 4:21
- Label: PIAS
- Songwriters: Robert del Naja; Grant Marshall; Tom Waits; Kathleen Brennan; Stew Jackson
- Producers: Robert del Naja; Grant Marshall; Stew Jackson

Massive Attack singles chronology
"Dear Friend" (2016)	"Boots on the Ground" (2026)

Tom Waits singles chronology
"Bella Ciao" (2018)	"Boots on the Ground" (2026)

"Boots on the Ground" is a protest song by English trip hop group Massive Attack, collaborating with American musician Tom Waits. The song was released on 16 April 2026, accompanied by a politically charged music video.

It was Massive Attack's first release in six years following their 2020 EP Eutopia, as well as Tom Waits' first original work in fifteen years, since his 2011 album Bad as Me. The song was not released on Spotify.

== Background ==
Regarding the collaboration, Massive Attack stated:

"It's a career honour to collaborate with an artist of the magnitude, originality and integrity of Tom, but this track is arriving in an atmosphere of chaos. Across the western hemisphere, state authoritarianism and the militarisation of police forces are fusing again with neo-fascist politics. Seen within the American emergency, at home and overseas, this track contains pulses of callous impulse and abandoned mind."

Furthermore, Tom Waits stated:

"One day many years ago, I accepted an invitation from Massive Attack to collaborate. Their long release delay never worried me. Today, as in all of mankind's yesterdays, guarantees this type of song will never go out of style. Man's folly of fiascos is a feast for the flies. Hence, the B-side of Massive Attack’s upcoming 12 inch 'The Fly' features my appreciation for the winged nuisance."

"Boots on the Ground" was released to all streaming platforms except for Spotify, following Massive Attack's threat to pull their entire catalog off of the platform in 2025 over CEO Daniel Ek's funding of military company Helsing and their AI technology.

== Reception ==
Writing for The Guardian, Alexis Petridis gave the song four stars, writing that the song "is dark, disturbing, ominous, with a distinct streak of WTF? running through it. Which makes it music perfectly fitting for the times." He also noted that: "Waits's presence on Boots on the Ground underlines Massive Attack's continued ability to attract blue-chip collaborators. Perhaps that's something to do with the fact that, from early on in their career, they appeared to treat their guest vocalists less as stars making cameo appearances than genuine partners."

Writing for Pitchfork, Philip Sherburne wrote: "With a title seemingly ripped from the mouths of the Republican Party's most avid warmongers, "Boots on the Ground" is a grimly timely song—it could apply equally to Iran, Venezuela, Cuba, or even, why not, Greenland—but it's also a reminder that the violence begins, and persists, right here at home."

In June 2026, Consequence named it the best song of the year so far.

== Charts ==
Chart performance for "Boots on the Ground"
Chart (2026)	Peak position
Swiss Albums (Schweizer Hitparade)	8
UK Singles Sales (Official Charts)	4
