= Buzz Foto =

Photo agency based in Los Angeles, founded by Brad Elterman and Henry Flores

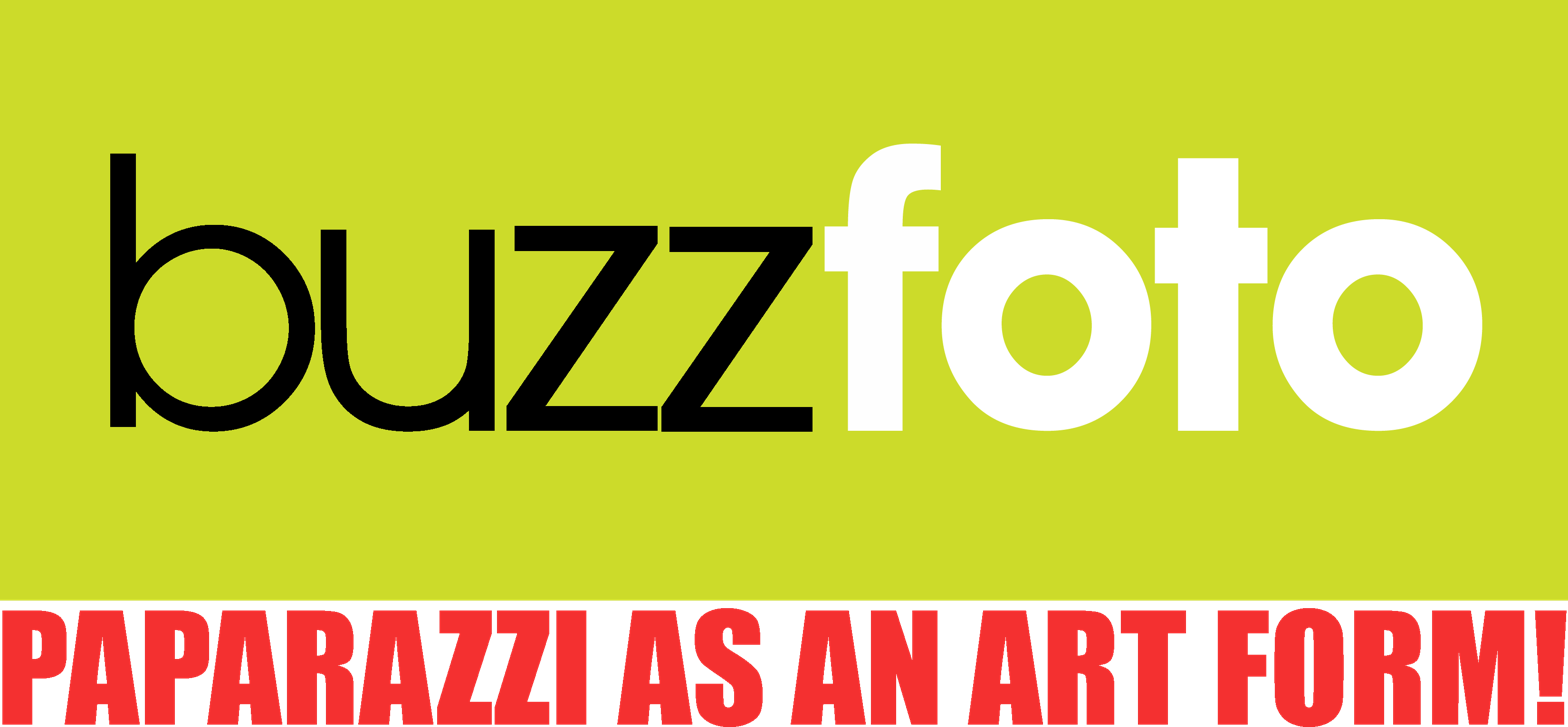
- Company type: Private
- Founded: June 1, 2006; 20 years ago
- Founder: Brad Elterman; Henry Flores
- Headquarters: Beverly Hills, California, U.S.
- Area served: Worldwide
- Website: buzzfoto.com

Buzz Foto is a photo agency based in Los Angeles, California, founded by photojournalists Brad Elterman and Henry Flores.

Buzz Foto is a producer and aggregator of editorial and creative photography, celebrity news and celebrity video footage. Buzz Foto has an online archive, a Media Grid based on Adobe Flash, of approximately one million images and digital assets.

Buzz Foto serves a large base of newspapers, magazines, web portals, television stations, book publishers, and e-media clients around the world.

Buzz Foto held the first modern day paparazzi exhibition at the Seyhoun Gallery in Beverly Hills, California, USA.

== History ==
Buzz Foto was founded in 2006 by Brad Elterman and Henry Flores. In 2007, they debuted their brand "Paparazzi As An Art Form!" in a televised interview on Extra

Following that, ABC News did its first presentation on Buzz Foto. ABC presented the owners teaching a Parsons student, Justin Campbell. Campbell was ready for his first paparazzi experience on Stephen Colbert as Colbert made his way to his car after giving a presentation at a New York City Apple Inc. Store.

In 2008, Buzz Foto was exhibited at the Seyhoun Gallery, owned by Maryam Seyhoun in West Hollywood, California, for its first paparazzi exhibition. Seyhoun jumped at the idea of featuring this type of art, because in her words, "It is art!"

Christine N. Ziemba, a correspondent for the Los Angeles Times, argued that "Paparazzi As An Art Form" may not fly, ending the article with "Don't laugh too hard. Andy Warhol's 'Gold Marilyn Monroe' now hangs at the Museum of Modern Art."

The First Modern Day Paparazzi Exhibition ran from February 16–21, 2008, during which ABC News did another interview with Elterman and Flores.

== Exhibits ==
- Seyhoun Gallery – Paparazzi As An Art Form! by Buzz Foto, Brad Elterman, and Henry Flores, February 15, 2008 – February 21, 2008 Beverly Hills, CA
- Sheraton Hotels and Resorts, Sheraton Gateway Los Angeles inside the Paparazzi Restaurant – A Day in the Life of the Paparazzi! by Henry Flores, July 1, 2010–present El Segundo, CA
