= Son of Rogues Gallery: Pirate Ballads, Sea Songs & Chanteys =

Son of Rogue's Gallery: Pirate Ballads, Sea Songs & Chanteys

Compilation album by Various artists
- Released: February 19, 2013
- Recorded: 2012
- Genre: Folk; Sea shanty
- Length: Disc 1: 70:54; Disc 2: 73:10; Total length: 144:04
- Label: ANTI- / Epitaph Records
- Producer: Hal Willner

Professional ratings
Aggregate scores
| Source | Rating |
|---|---|
| Metacritic | 76/100 |
Review scores
| Source | Rating |
| AllMusic | 4.5/5 stars |
| BBC | Positive |
| The Boston Globe | Mixed |
| Consequence of Sound | C− |
| The Guardian | 4/5 stars |
| The Independent | Positive |
| NME | 6/10 |
| PopMatters | 7/10 stars |
| Record Collector | 3 stars |
| Rolling Stone | 3/5 stars |

Son of Rogues Gallery: Pirate Ballads, Sea Songs & Chanteys is a compilation album of sea shanties and the follow-up to Rogue's Gallery: Pirate Ballads, Sea Songs, and Chanteys. The concept is the same as it was on the first album: artists representing a variety of genres perform cover versions of sea shanties. Performers include musicians like Tom Waits, Iggy Pop, Big Freedia, Patti Smith, Sean Lennon, Petra Haden, Dr. John, Nick Cave, Shane MacGowan, Macy Gray, Todd Rundgren, Courtney Love, Michael Stipe, Keith Richards, and Frank Zappa, alongside actors like Johnny Depp, Anjelica Huston, and Tim Robbins.

== Track listing ==
All songs traditional, except where noted.

Disc One
| No. | Title | Writer(s) | Performer(s) | Length |
|---|---|---|---|---|
| 1. | "Leaving of Liverpool" | | Shane MacGowan | 4:01 |
| 2. | "Sam's Gone Away" | | Robyn Hitchcock | 2:45 |
| 3. | "Bamboo (River Come Down)" | Herbert Haufrecht, Dave Van Ronk | Beth Orton | 6:17 |
| 4. | "Row Bullies Row" | | Sean Lennon & Charlotte Kemp Muhl w/ Jack Shit | 4:07 |
| 5. | "Shenandoah" | | Tom Waits w/ Keith Richards | 4:02 |
| 6. | "Mr. Stormalong" | | Ivan Neville | 4:06 |
| 7. | "Asshole Rules the Navy" | | Iggy Pop w/ A Hawk and a Hacksaw | 2:04 |
| 8. | "Off to Sea Once More" | | Macy Gray | 5:01 |
| 9. | "The Ol' OG" | | Ed Harcourt | 3:26 |
| 10. | "Pirate Jenny" | Kurt Weill, Bertolt Brecht, Marc Blitzstein | Shilpa Ray w/ Nick Cave & Warren Ellis | 7:30 |
| 11. | "The Mermaid" | Patti Smith | Patti Smith & Johnny Depp | 2:25 |
| 12. | "Anthem for Old Souls" | Chuck E. Weiss | Chuck E. Weiss | 4:30 |
| 13. | "Orange Claw Hammer" | Don Van Vliet | Ed Pastorini | 3:17 |
| 14. | "Sweet and Low" | Patrick Ferris | The Americans | 3:29 |
| 15. | "Ye Mariners All" | | Robin Holcomb & Jessika Kenney | 4:24 |
| 16. | "Tom's Gone to Hilo" | | Gavin Friday & Shannon McNally | 4:50 |
| 17. | "Bear Away" | | Kenny Wollesen & the Himalayas | 5:35 |

Disc Two
| No. | Title | Writer(s) | Performer(s) | Length |
|---|---|---|---|---|
| 1. | "Wedding Dress Song/Handsome Cabin Boy" | | Frank Zappa & the Mothers of Invention | 2:36 |
| 2. | "Rio Grande" | | Michael Stipe & Courtney Love w/ Jack Shit | 2:47 |
| 3. | "Ship in Distress" | | Marc Almond | 2:29 |
| 4. | "In Lure of the Tropics" | Mac Rebennack, Clarence Leonard Hay | Dr. John | 5:01 |
| 5. | "Rolling Down to Old Maui" | | Todd Rundgren | 3:46 |
| 6. | "Jack Tar on Shore" | | Dan Zanes w/ Broken Social Scene | 3:10 |
| 7. | "Sally Racket" | | Katey Red & Big Freedia w/ Akron/Family | 2:57 |
| 8. | "Wild Goose" | | Broken Social Scene | 6:10 |
| 9. | "Flandyke Shore" | | Marianne Faithfull w/ Kate and Anna McGarrigle | 3:09 |
| 10. | "The Chantey of Noah and his Ark (Old School Song)" | | Ricky Jay | 6:18 |
| 11. | "Whiskey Johnny" | | Michael Gira | 2:16 |
| 12. | "Sunshine Life for Me" | George Harrison | Petra Haden w/ Lenny Pickett | 3:44 |
| 13. | "Row the Boat Child" | | Jenni Muldaur | 2:35 |
| 14. | "General Taylor" | | Richard Thompson w/ Jack Shit | 3:53 |
| 15. | "Marianne" | | Tim Robbins w/ Matthew Sweet & Susanna Hoffs | 4:20 |
| 16. | "Barnacle Bill the Sailor" | | Kembra Pfahler | 3:31 |
| 17. | "Missus McGraw" | | Anjelica Huston | 5:08 |
| 18. | "The Dreadnought" | | Iggy Pop & the Elegant Too | 2:32 |
| 19. | "Then Said the Captain to Me (Two Poems of the Sea)" | Mary Margaret O'Hara | Mary Margaret O'Hara | 1:48 |

== Track information ==
There are two songs that have been released previously to this compilation. The instrumental medley "Wedding Dress Song/Handsome Cabin Boy" by Frank Zappa & the Mothers of Invention was recorded between 1962 and 1972 and first released as part of the 1986 compilation album Mystery Disc #2. Secondly, Marianne Faithfull's "Flandyke Shore" featuring sisters Anna & Kate McGarrigle was originally released on Faithfull's 2008 cover-album Easy Come, Easy Go.
