= Chuck E. Weiss =

American songwriter and vocalist (1945–2021)

- Born: Charles Edward Weiss; March 18, 1945; Denver, Colorado, U.S.
- Died: July 20, 2021 (aged 76) Los Angeles, California
- Occupations: Singer, songwriter, actor

Charles Edward Weiss (March 18, 1945 – July 20, 2021) was an American songwriter and vocalist. A fixture on the Los Angeles scene, Weiss was known for an eclectic mix of blues, beat poetry, and rock and roll. His music included strains of every rhythmic style from nursery rhymes to zydeco.

== Early life ==
Weiss was born in Denver, Colorado, on March 18, 1945. His parents owned a record store (The Record Center, 434 16th Street). Through his parents, and by spending time at a local music venue, Ebbetts Field, he met Lightnin' Hopkins. Hopkins was impressed with his drum playing and took him on tour, where Weiss had the opportunity to play with Muddy Waters, Howlin' Wolf, Roger Miller, Dr. John, and others. Weiss was a disc jockey on alternative rock station KFML-FM-Denver in the early 1970s.

== Music ==
Weiss' first credited releases are on Tom Waits records, and the two acts – close friends after meeting when Waits played at the Denver nightclub, Ebbetts Field, where Weiss played in the house band in the early 1970s – would continue to be associated from the rest of Weiss' career. Weiss co-wrote Spare Parts 1 on Wait's Nighthawks at the Diner, while being namechecked in another song. Chuck was referred to in Tom Waits' song title "Jitterbug Boy (Sharing a Curbstone with Chuck E. Weiss, Robert Marchese, Paul Body and The Mug and Artie)" and in other lyrics from the Small Change album. Weiss was the subject of Rickie Lee Jones's hit song "Chuck E.'s In Love", from her 1979 debut album. At the time, Jones was linked romantically to Tom Waits. All three lived in the Tropicana Motel in Los Angeles, in the middle of a fertile musical scene including Levi and the Rockats, Stray Cats, Black Flag, Frank Zappa and others.

Weiss's first album, The Other Side of Town, was released in 1981, a short album whose eight tracks clocked in at just 24 minutes, produced by a team previously associated with Joe Cocker. Weiss was associated with Los Angeles and Southern California for years, which he explained by saying he does not like to travel by airplane, in truth his cult of celebrity amongst Hollywood socialites stemmed from his prominent playing in various house bands along Sunset Strip through the 1970s and 1980s. Weiss played for 11 years on Mondays at a club called "The Central" before it fell on hard times. Weiss and his friend Johnny Depp, were instrumental in resuscitating it as the Viper Room, which later became notorious when River Phoenix died there in 1993. Weiss was featured on the 1990 album L.A. Ya Ya, a compilation of performances by Los Angeles–based blues artists. In 1995, Weiss played on P's self-titled album. The band featured Gibby Haynes of the Butthole Surfers and actor Johnny Depp.

Weiss released his second album, Extremely Cool, in 1999, featuring extensive collaboration with Tony Gilkyson, JJ Holiday, and Tom Waits, who co-produced the album for his long-time acquaintance, Waits plays guitar across the album, and co-wrote two tracks, re-recording one of the songs Rains on me for the Free The West Memphis 3 benefit album the following year. The style is heavily reminiscent of Waits, both in composition and vocal approach. Either could have influenced the other. The opening track, "Devil With Blue Suede Shoes", was produced by Johnny Depp and featured Toby Dammit on drums. It was used in Depp's film, The Brave, in which Weiss also played a minor role. Willie Dixon was quoted on the original packaging of Extremely Cool as saying, "Ain't ya got ears son? That little Jew boy with the big old head be one of the best musicians in this town, this country even." Extremely Cool makes reference to Canter's Kibitz Room, a small nightclub in a larger deli in Los Angeles's Fairfax District, where Weiss also played habitually. His regular band was called The Goddamn Liars.

Weiss' next album after Extremely Cool, Old Souls & Wolf Tickets, was released in 2001. It was also produced by Gilkyson and is perhaps less reminiscent of Tom Waits and more redolent of Delta blues acts decades older. "Down the Road a Piece," from Old Souls & Wolf Tickets, is a 1970 recording of the Weiss and Willie Dixon playing together. In 2006, Weiss released the album 23rd & Stout, an album more reminiscent of Waits's 1980s output, featuring an exploration of many blues and rumba styles, as well as a tribute to Sterling Holloway, entitled "Sho' Is Cold". Also featured is long time friend and collaborator, Diablo Dimes. In 2013, Weiss wrote and recorded "Anthem for Old Souls" for the Sea shanty-compilation Son of Rogues Gallery: Pirate Ballads, Sea Songs & Chanteys (2013). In 2014, Weiss released Red Beans and Weiss, on the Anti- label.

== Television ==
Weiss acted in occasional bit parts on American television.

He made brief cameos on two 1990 Married... with Children episodes as a homeless man, and one on an episode of Brotherly Love, as Leo the garbage man in 1995. He also made an appearance on My Wife and Kids (2001-2005).

In the May 14, 2002 episode of Gilmore Girls entitled "Lorelai's Graduation Day", Weiss appeared as the proprietor of a record store in New York City.

Weiss was a frequent guest on Art Fein's Poker Party, a long running Public Access "Rock-n-Roll Talk Show" in the mid 1980s and early 1990s. https://www.youtube.com/watch?v=JP_GrmYVF6c

== Personal life ==
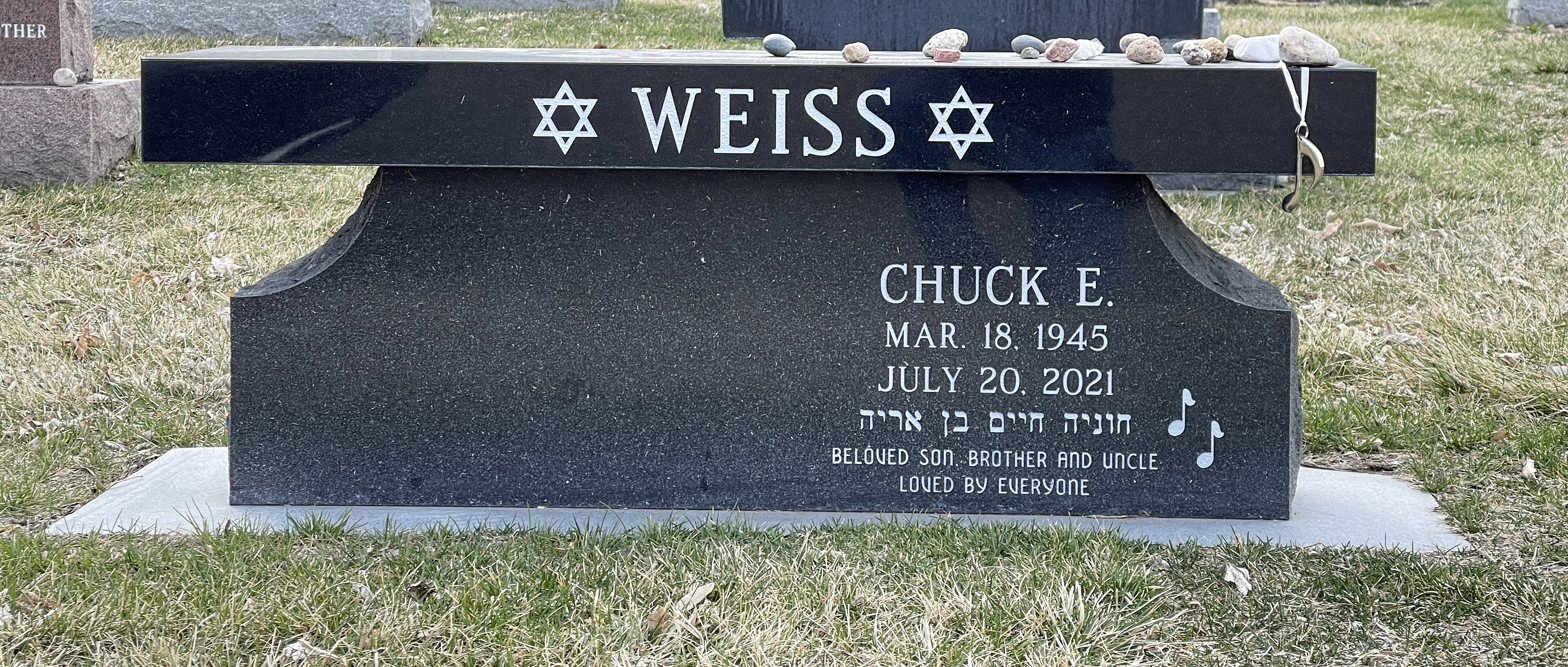
Weiss' gravestone in Denver's Fairmount Cemetery

Weiss was a lifelong bachelor and had no children. His next of kin was his older brother, Byron "Whiz" Weiss.

Weiss died on July 20, 2021, in Los Angeles at the age of 76. He suffered from cancer prior to his death.
