= Brad Elterman =

American professional photographer

- Years active: 1970–present
- Website: http://www.BradElterman.com

Brad Elterman is a professional photographer from Los Angeles, California, who addressed the rock 'n' roll lifestyle in Hollywood encompassing pop, punk and rock bands. He started his career at the age of 16 taking and selling a photo of Bob Dylan in concert in 1974. He went on to photograph bands and artists of the 1970s, including the Faces with Rod Stewart, David Bowie, Robert Plant, Sex Pistols, the Runaways, Bebe Buell, Kiss, Queen, Blondie, the Ramones, Bay City Rollers, ABBA, Boney M, Kenny Rogers, The Who, Leif Garrett and Michael Jackson. Some of the magazines, newspapers and other publications that he contributed to include Creem, Circus, Rolling Stone, People, Hit Parader, New York Post, National Enquirer, New Musical Express, and Melody Maker.

Elterman describes his photography as focused on the "backstage" aspect of rock 'n' roll stars' lives:

I wasn't a traditional rock 'n' roll photographer because I didn't give a shit about taking a photograph of someone holding a guitar. That's what all the other photographers at the time were doing, and I wasn't interested in those generic concert pictures. I photographed backstage—those were the really exciting pictures that told a story; those were the images that the magazines were craving.

Fall 2010 saw the publication of Elterman's fine art coffee table book, Like It Was Yesterday published by Seventy Seven Press, LLC. The book featured in L'Officiel France, Vogue Brazil, Rolling Stone Brazil, Rocking On Japan, Rolling Stone Japan, MOJO, Monster Children and Vice.

Elterman is continuing to work with fashion brands and to photograph figures from pop and rock culture, including Sunflower Bean, Shawn Mendes, Mac DeMarco, Connan Mockasin, and The Buttertones. His photos appear in Purple magazine, Purple Diary, Dazed, and Interview. Vice.com publishes his monthly "Le Reve" column.

His third book entitled Dog Dance was published by Damiani editor designed by Sandy Kim with a foreword provided by Oliver Zahm.

== Bibliography ==
- Brad Elterman (1985). Shoot The Stars - How To Become a Celebrity Photographer. California Features International, Inc. ISBN 0-933781-00-8.
- Brad Elterman (2009). Like It Was Yesterday. Seventy Seven Press, LLC. ISBN 978-0-615-37229-7.

== Filmography ==
Year	Title	Role	Notes
2010	Smash His Camera	Himself	Shot in Beverly Hills, California, Credited as Brad Elterman, Co-Owner of Buzz Foto
2010	Teenage Paparazzo	Himself	Shot in Beverly Hills, California, Credited as Brad Elterman, Co-Owner of Buzz Foto
