= Tom Waits =

American musician and actor (born 1949)

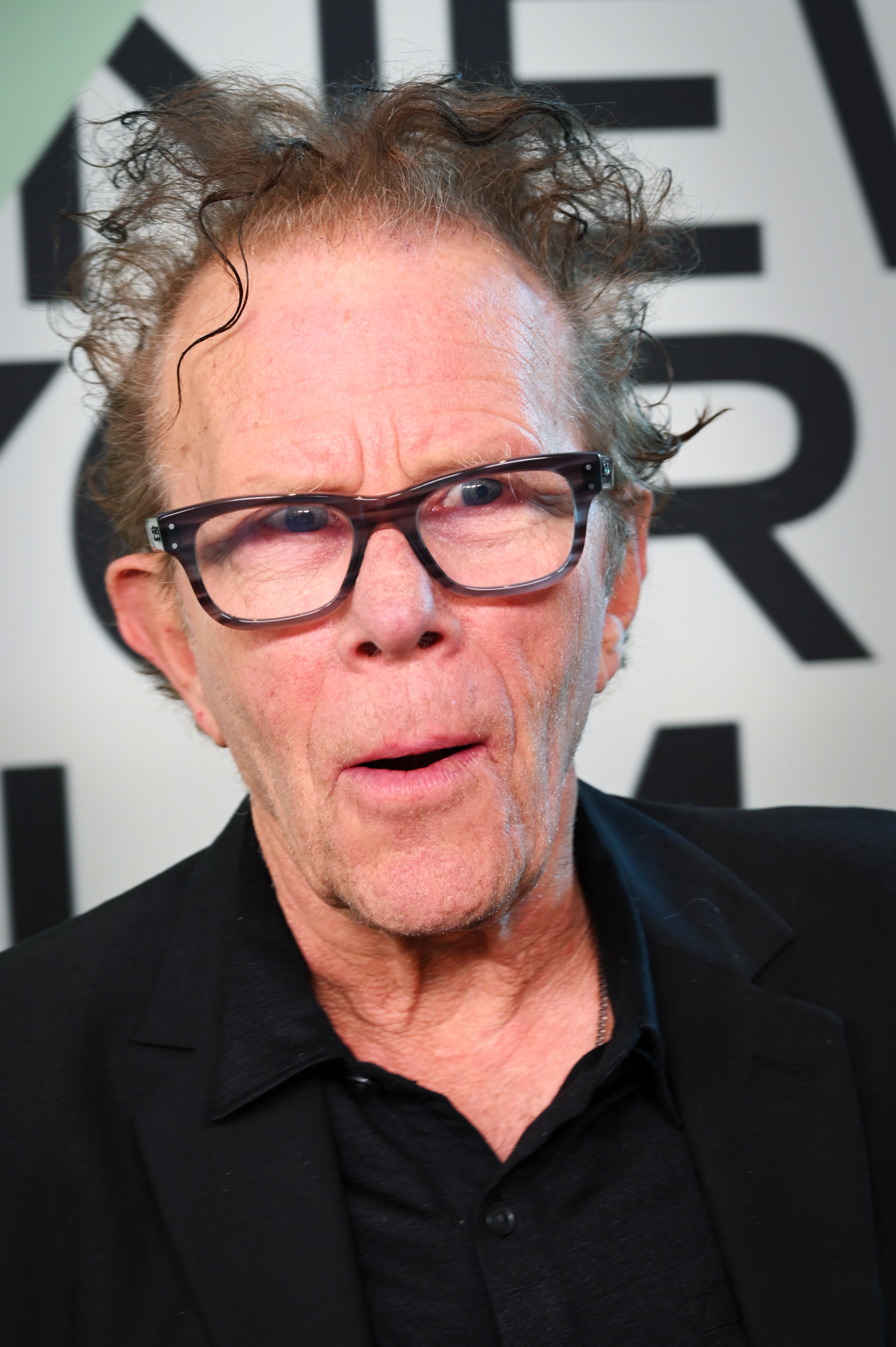
- Waits in 2025
- Born: Thomas Alan Waits; December 7, 1949 (age 76); Pomona, California, U.S.
- Occupations: Singer; songwriter; composer; actor
- Years active: 1969–present
- Spouse: Kathleen Brennan (m. 1980)
- Children: 3
- Musical career
- Genres: Experimental; rock; blues; jazz
- Instruments: Vocals; guitar; keyboards; percussion
- Works: Tom Waits discography
- Labels: Asylum; Island; Anti-
- Website: tomwaits.com

Thomas Alan Waits (born December 7, 1949) is an American singer, songwriter, composer and actor. His lyrics often focus on society's underbelly and are delivered in his trademark deep, gravelly voice. He began in the folk scene during the 1970s, but his music since the 1980s has reflected the influence of such diverse genres as rock, jazz, Delta blues, opera, vaudeville, cabaret, funk and experimental techniques verging on industrial music. Jim Fusilli calls him "A keen, sensitive and sympathetic chronicler of the adrift and downtrodden" who "creates three-dimensional characters who, even in their confusion and despair, are capable of insight and startling points of view." His unique voice was described by Daniel Durchholz as sounding "like it was soaked in a vat of bourbon, left hanging in the smokehouse for a few months, and then taken outside and run over with a car."

Waits was born into a middle-class family in Pomona, California, who then moved to Whittier in 1949. His family lived on Kentucky Avenue (and briefly Pickering Avenue), a pivotal setting for his memories. Inspired by the work of Bob Dylan and the Beat Generation, he began singing on the San Diego folk circuit. He moved to Los Angeles in 1972, where he worked as a songwriter before signing a recording contract with Asylum Records. His debut album was Closing Time (1973), followed by The Heart of Saturday Night (1974) and Nighthawks at the Diner (1975). He toured the United States, Europe, and Japan, finding greater critical and commercial success with Small Change (1976), Blue Valentine (1978), and Heartattack and Vine (1980). In 1978, Waits entered the world of film, where he met Kathleen Brennan. He collaborated with Crystal Gayle on the soundtrack of Francis Ford Coppola's One From the Heart (1982) and made cameos in several Coppola films.

In 1980, Waits married Brennan, split from his manager and record label, and moved to New York City. With Brennan's encouragement and frequent collaboration, he pursued a more eclectic and experimental sound influenced by Harry Partch and Captain Beefheart, as heard on the loose trilogy Swordfishtrombones (1983), Rain Dogs (1985) and Franks Wild Years (1987). In 1990, he collaborated with theater director Robert Wilson on the musical The Black Rider, the songs for which were released on the album of the same name. Waits and Wilson reunited for the musicals Alice (1992) and Woyzeck (2000). In 2002, the songs from the two musicals were released on the albums Alice and Blood Money. Waits won Grammys for Best Alternative Music Album and Best Contemporary Folk Album for Bone Machine (1992) and Mule Variations (1999). Waits went on to release Real Gone (2004), the compilation Orphans: Brawlers, Bawlers & Bastards (2006), the live album Glitter and Doom Live (2009) and Bad as Me (2011). Waits has not toured since 2008 and has not issued a new album since 2011, though he continues to make isolated (and widely spaced) appearances guesting at concerts and special events. He also has published poetry and has continued his acting career, encompassing a range of offbeat character roles.

Waits has influenced many artists and gained an international cult following. His songs have been covered by Bruce Springsteen, Tori Amos, Rod Stewart, and the Eagles and he has written songs for Johnny Cash and Norah Jones among others. In 2011, he was inducted into the Rock and Roll Hall of Fame. Introducing him, Neil Young said "This next man is indescribable, and I'm here to describe him. He's sort of a performer, singer, actor, magician, spirit guide, changeling..." Accepting the honor, Waits mused: "They say that I have no hits and I'm difficult to work with. And they say that like it's a bad thing!"

== Early life ==
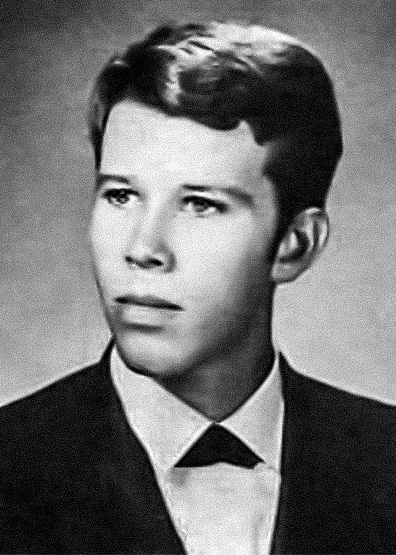
Waits as a high-school senior at Hilltop High School in Chula Vista, California in 1967. He dropped out at the age of 18.

Thomas Alan Waits was born on December 7, 1949, in Pomona, California, in the Los Angeles County metropolitan area. He has one older and one younger sister. His father, Jesse Frank Waits, was a Texas native of Scots-Irish descent, and his mother, Alma Fern (née Johnson), hailed from Oregon and had Norwegian ancestry. Alma, a regular church-goer, managed the household. Jesse taught Spanish at a local school and was an alcoholic; Waits later related that his father was "a tough one, always an outsider." The family soon moved to nearby Whittier where Tom spent most of his childhood years. Waits once recounted from the stage in 1976:

I grew up on a street called Kentucky Avenue in Whittier, California. My dad was teaching night school at Montebello. I had a little tree fort and everything. I had my first cigarette when I was about seven years old. It was such a thrill. I used to pick 'em up right out of the gutter after it was raining. My dad smoked Kents. Now, I never liked Kents - I tried to get him to change brands. I used to repair everybody's bicycles in the neighborhood. I was the little neighborhood mechanic. There was a guy called Joey Navinski who played the trombone, and a guy called Dickie Faulkner whose nose was always running. And there was a woman called Mrs. Storm. She lived with her sister. She used to sit in her kitchen with her window open and a twelve-gauge shotgun [sticking] out of it ... so we took the long way around. (Live at the Apollo Theatre, London, UK. March 23, 1976.)

In a 1979 interview, Waits added in a more humorous vein:

I used to walk down Kentucky Avenue collecting cigarette butts. And I finally got me a paper route. I used to get up at 1 o' clock in the morning so I could deliver my papers and still have time to break the law ...

He recalled having a "very middle-class" upbringing and "a pretty normal childhood". He attended Jordan Elementary School, where he was bullied. There, he learned to play the bugle and guitar. His father taught him to play the ukulele.

During the summers, he visited maternal relatives in Gridley and Marysville, both in California. He later recalled that it was an uncle's raspy, gravelly timbre that inspired his own singing voice. In 1959, his parents separated and his father moved away from the family home, a traumatic experience for the 10-year-old Waits. Alma took her children and relocated to Chula Vista, a middle-class suburb of San Diego. Jesse visited the family there, taking his children on trips to Tijuana. In nearby Southeast San Diego, Waits attended O'Farrell Community School, where he fronted a school band, the Systems, which he described as "white kids trying to get that Motown sound." He developed a love of R&B and soul singers like Ray Charles and Wilson Pickett, as well as country music and Roy Orbison. Bob Dylan later became an inspiration; Waits placed transcriptions of Dylan's lyrics on his bedroom walls.

Waits recalls: "I was fifteen and I snuck in to see Lightnin' Hopkins. Amazing show. Every time he opened his mouth he had that orchestra of gold teeth, and I was devastated... He walked through a door, and slammed the door behind him, and on the door it said, I swear to God, 'KEEP OUT. This room is for entertainers ONLY.' And I knew, at that moment, that I had to get into show business as soon as possible." He recalls: "I first saw James Brown in 1962 at an outdoor theatre in San Diego and it was indescribable ... it was like putting a finger in a light socket... It was really like seeing mass at St. Patrick's Cathedral on Christmas." By the time he was studying at Hilltop High School in Chula Vista, California, he later said he was "kind of an amateur juvenile delinquent", interested in "malicious mischief" and breaking the law. He later said that he was a "rebel against the rebels", eschewing the hippie subculture which was growing in popularity, for the 1950s Beat Generation, especially Jack Kerouac, Allen Ginsberg, and William S. Burroughs. In 1968, at age 18, Waits dropped out of high school. He was an avid watcher of Alfred Hitchcock Presents and The Twilight Zone. Another influence was the comedian Lenny Bruce.

Waits worked at Napoleone's pizza restaurant in National City, California, and both there and at a local diner developed an interest in the lives of the patrons, writing down phrases and snippets of dialogue he overheard. He worked in the forestry service as a fireman for three years and served with the U.S. Coast Guard. He enrolled at Southwestern Community College in Chula Vista to study photography, for a time considering a career in the field. He continued pursuing his musical interests, taking piano lessons. He began frequenting venues around San Diego, being drawn into the city's folk scene.

== Career ==
=== Early musical career: 1969–1976 ===
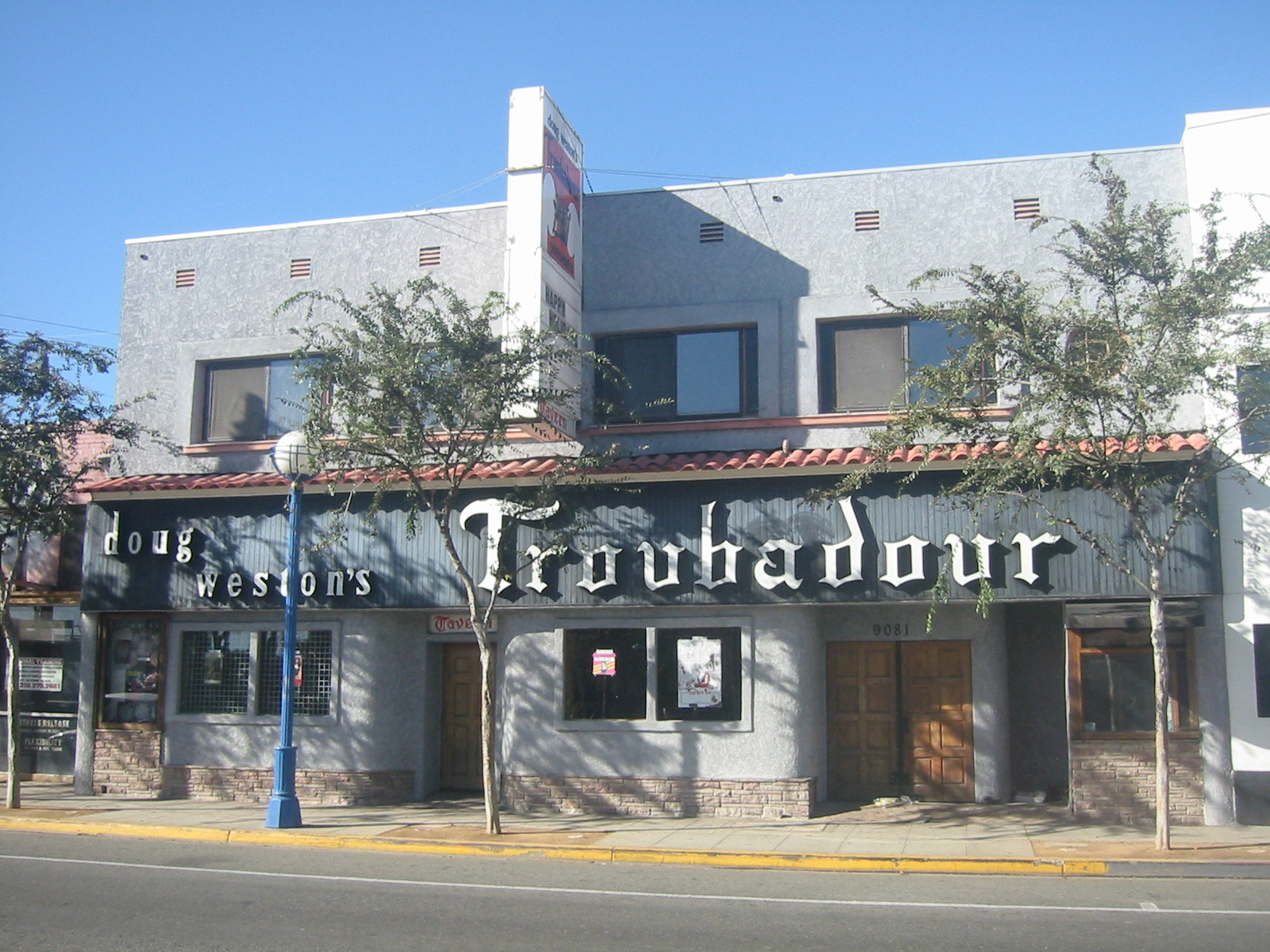
The Troubadour in West Hollywood, where Waits's performances brought him to the attention of Herb Cohen and David Geffen

In 1969, he was hired as an occasional doorman for the Heritage coffeehouse, which held regular performances from folk musicians. He began to sing at the Heritage; his set initially consisted largely of covers of Dylan and Red Sovine's "Phantom 309". In time, he performed his own material as well, often parodies of country songs or bittersweet ballads influenced by his relationships; these included early songs "Ol' 55" and "I Hope That I Don't Fall in Love With You". As his reputation grew, he played at other San Diego venues, supporting acts like Tim Buckley, Sonny Terry, Brownie McGhee, and his friend Jack Tempchin.

Aware that San Diego offered little opportunity for career progression, Waits began traveling into Los Angeles to play at the Troubadour in West Hollywood. It was there, in the autumn of 1971, that Waits came to the attention of Herb Cohen, who signed him to publishing and recording contracts. The recordings that were produced under that recording agreement were eventually released in the early 1990s as The Early Years and The Early Years, Volume Two. In early 1972, after quitting his job at Napoleone's to concentrate on his songwriting career, Waits moved to an apartment in Silver Lake, Los Angeles, a poor neighborhood known for its Hispanic and bohemian communities. He continued performing at the Troubadour and there met David Geffen, who gave Waits a recording contract with his Asylum Records. Jerry Yester was chosen to produce his first album, with the recording sessions taking place in Hollywood's Sunset Sound studios. The album, Closing Time, was released in March 1973 although it attracted little attention and did not sell well. Biographer Barney Hoskyns noted that Closing Time was "broadly in step with the singer-songwriter school of the early 1970s"; Waits had wanted to create a piano-led jazz album although Yester had pushed its sound in a more folk-oriented direction. Buckley covered "Martha" on his album Sefronia later that year. An Eagles recording of "Ol' 55" on their album On the Border brought Waits further money and recognition, although he regarded their version as "a little antiseptic".

To promote his debut, Waits and a three-piece band embarked on a U.S. tour, where he was the supporting act for more established artists. He supported Tom Rush at Washington D.C.'s The Cellar Door, Danny O'Keefe in Cambridge, Massachusetts's Club Passim, Charlie Rich at New York City's Max's Kansas City, Martha Reeves and the Vandellas in East Lansing, Michigan, and John P. Hammond in San Francisco. Waits returned to Los Angeles in June, feeling demoralized about his career. That month, he was the cover star of free music magazine Music World. He began composing songs for his second album, and attended the Venice Poetry Workshop to try out this new material in front of an audience. Although Waits was eager to record this new material, Cohen instead convinced him to take over as a support act for Frank Zappa's the Mothers of Invention after previous support act Kathy Dalton pulled out due to the hostility from Zappa's fans. Waits joined Zappa's tour in Ontario, but like Dalton found the audiences hostile; while on stage he was jeered at and pelted with fruit. Although he liked the Mothers of Invention, he was intimidated by Zappa himself.

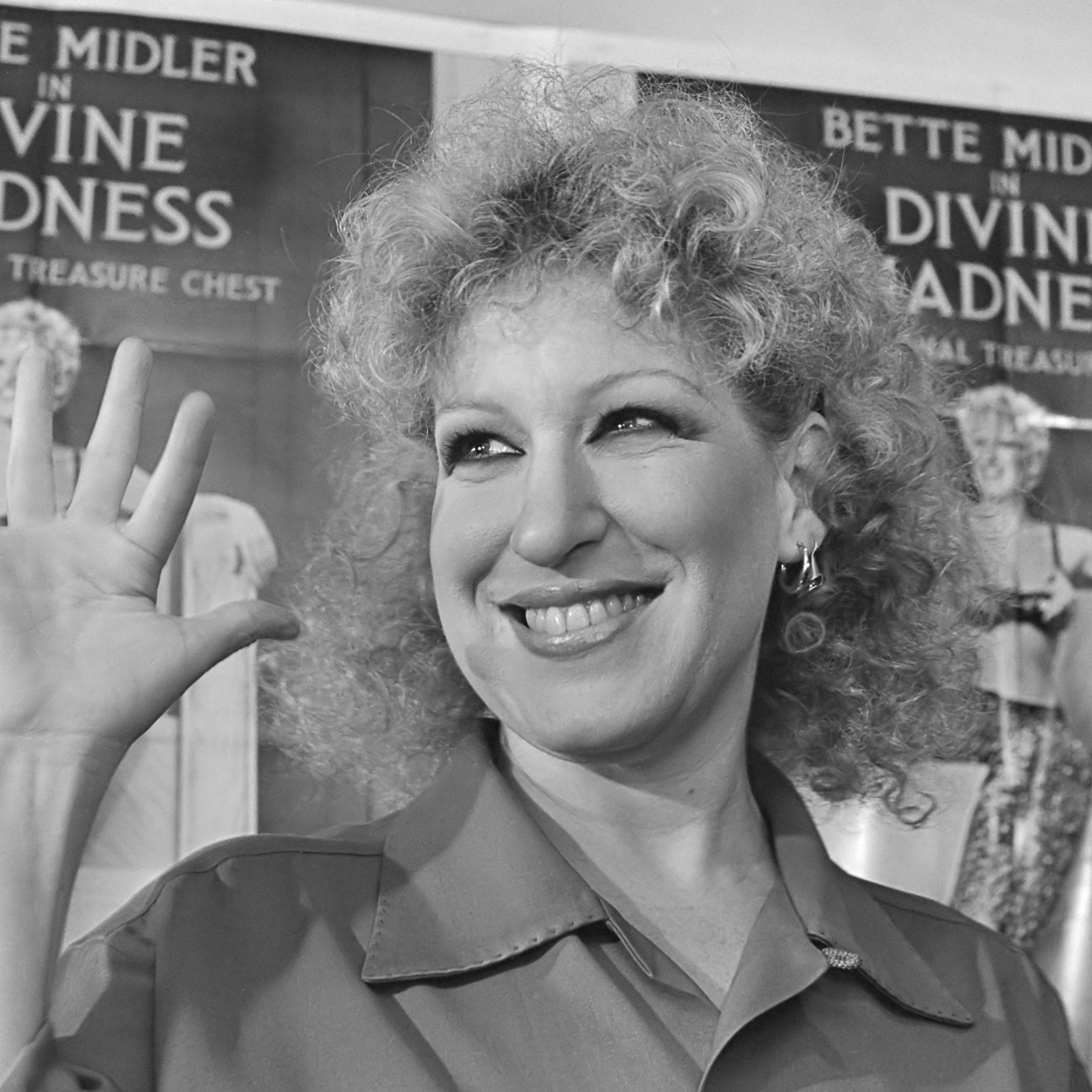
Waits met and had an intermittent romantic relationship with Bette Midler (pictured here in 1981) and collaborated with her on the song "I Never Talk to Strangers".

Waits moved from Silver Lake to Echo Park, spending much of his time in downtown Los Angeles. In early 1974, he continued to perform around the West Coast, getting as far as Denver. For Waits's second album, Geffen wanted a more jazz-oriented producer, selecting Bones Howe for the job. Howe recounts his first encounter with the young artist: "I told him I thought his music and lyrics had a Kerouac quality to them, and he was blown away that I knew who Jack Kerouac was. I told him I also played jazz drums and he went wild. Then I told him that when I was working for Norman Granz, Norman had found these tapes of Kerouac reading his poetry from The Beat Generation in a hotel room. I told Waits I'd make him a copy. That sealed it." Recording sessions for The Heart of Saturday Night took place at Wally Heider's Studio 3 on Cahuenga Boulevard in Hollywood in April and May, with Waits conceptualizing the album as a sequence of songs about U.S. nightlife. The album was far more widely reviewed than Closing Time had been. Waits himself later dismissed the album as "very ill-formed, but I was trying".

After recording The Heart of Saturday Night, Waits reluctantly agreed to tour with Zappa again, but once more faced strong audience hostility. The kudos of having supported Zappa's tour nevertheless bolstered his image in the music industry and helped his career. In October 1974, he first performed as the headline act before touring the East Coast; in New York City he met and befriended Bette Midler, with whom he had a sporadic affair. Back in Los Angeles, Cohen suggested Waits produce a live album. To this end, he performed two shows at the Record Plant Studio in front of a small invited audience to recreate the atmosphere of a jazz club. Again produced and engineered by Howe (as all his future Asylum releases would be), it was released as Nighthawks at the Diner in October 1975. The album cover and title were inspired by Edward Hopper's Nighthawks (1942).

He followed this with a week's residency at the Reno Sweeney nightclub, an off-Broadway–style club in New York City. In December he appeared on the PBS concert show Soundstage. From March to May 1976, he toured the U.S., telling interviewers that the experience was tough and that he was drinking too much alcohol. In May, he embarked on his first tour of Europe, performing in London, Amsterdam, Brussels and Copenhagen. On his return to Los Angeles, he joined his friend Chuck E. Weiss, moving into the Tropicana Motel in West Hollywood, which had an established reputation in rock music circles. Visitors noted his two-room apartment there was heavily cluttered. Waits told the Los Angeles Times that "You almost have to create situations in order to write about them, so I live in a constant state of self-imposed poverty".

=== Small Change and Foreign Affairs: 1976–1978 ===
In July 1976, Waits recorded Small Change, again produced by Howe. He recalled it as a seminal episode in his development as a songwriter, the point when he became "completely confident in the craft". The album was critically well received and was his first release to break into the Billboard Top 100 Album List, peaking at 89. Per Bowman, Small Change "made it clear that Waits had evolved into a master storyteller, reflecting the influence of crime-noir writers such as Dashiell Hammett and John D. MacDonald. Arguably his first masterpiece, the album featured exquisite piano ballads such as "Tom Traubert's Blues" and "The Piano Has Been Drinking (Not Me)," the word-jazz of "Pasties and a G-String," and the tour-de-force tenor-sax-accompanied hucksterism of "Step Right Up". He received growing press attention, being profiled in Newsweek, Time, Vogue, and The New Yorker; he had begun to accrue a cult following. He went on tour to promote the new album, backed by the Nocturnal Emissions (Frank Vicari, Chip White and Fitz Jenkins). In reference to "Pasties and a G-String", a female stripper joined him onstage. He began 1977 by touring Japan for the first time.

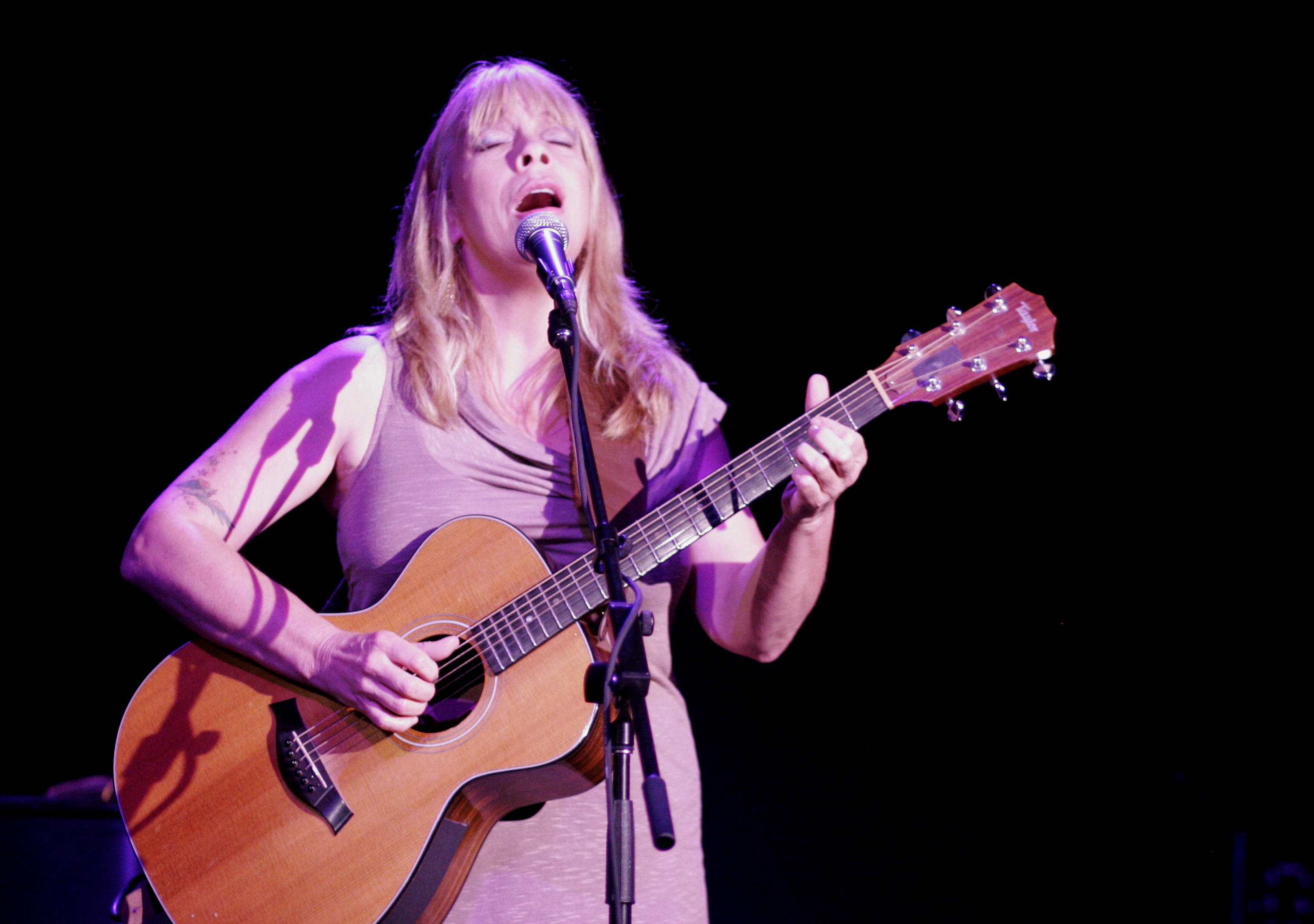
In 1977, Waits began a relationship with singer-songwriter Rickie Lee Jones (pictured here in 2008); their work and styles influenced each other.

Back in Los Angeles, he encountered various problems. One female fan, recently escaped from a mental health institution in Illinois, began stalking him and lurking outside his Tropicana apartment. In May 1977, Waits and close friend Chuck E. Weiss were arrested for fighting with police officers in a coffee shop. They were charged with two counts of disturbing the peace but were acquitted after the defense produced eight witnesses who refuted the police officers' account of the incident. In response, Waits sued the Los Angeles Police Department and five years later was awarded $7,500 in damages.

In July and August 1977, he recorded his fourth studio album, Foreign Affairs; Bob Alcivar had been employed as its arranger. The album included "I Never Talk to Strangers", a duet with Midler, with whom he was still in an intermittent relationship. She appeared with him at the Troubadour to sing the song; the next day he repaid the favor by performing at a gay rights benefit at the Hollywood Bowl that Midler was involved with. Foreign Affairs was not as well received by critics as its predecessor, and unlike Small Change failed to make the Billboard Top 100 album chart. That year, he began a relationship with the singer-songwriter Rickie Lee Jones; their work and styles influenced each other. In October 1977, he returned to touring with the Nocturnal Emissions; it was on this tour that he first began using props onstage, in this case a street lamp. Again, he found the tour exhausting. In March 1978, he embarked on his second tour of Japan.

During these years, Waits sought to broaden his career beyond music. He befriended actor and director Sylvester Stallone and made his film debut as a drunken piano player in Stallone's Paradise Alley (1978). With Paul Hampton, Waits also began writing a movie musical, although this project never came to fruition. Another project he began at this time was a book about entertainers of the past whom he admired.

=== Blue Valentine and Heartattack and Vine: 1978–1980 ===
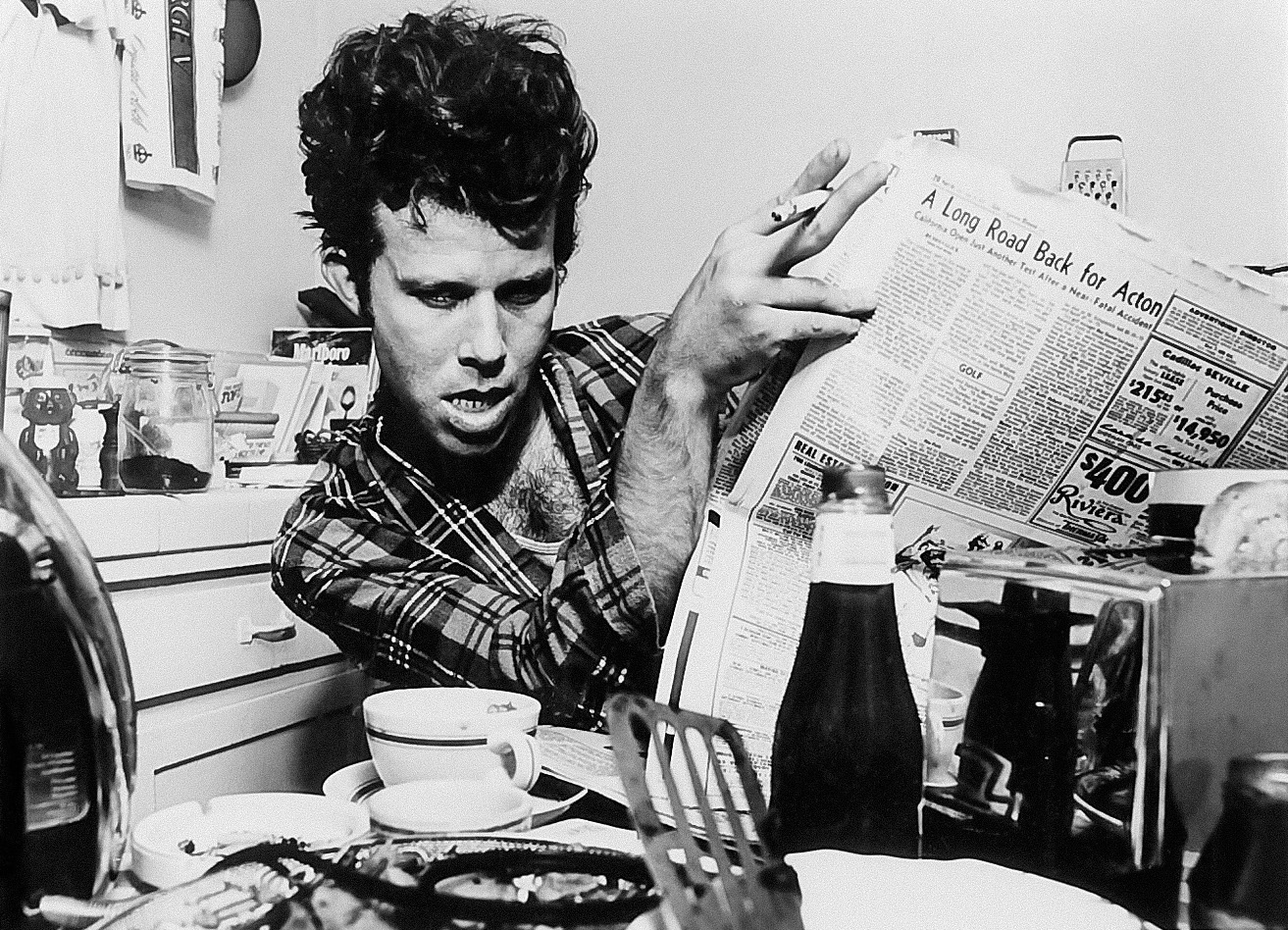
Publicity photo of Waits taken by Greg Gorman, c. 1979–80

In July 1978, Waits began the recording sessions for Blue Valentine. Part way through the sessions, he replaced his musicians to create a less jazz-oriented sound; for the album, he switched from a piano to an electric guitar as his main instrument. For the album's back cover, Waits used a picture of himself and Jones leaning against his car, a 1964 Ford Thunderbird, taken by Elliot Gilbert. Per Bowman, "Waits gradually began writing about junkies and prostitutes instead of skid-row drunks. In songs such as 'Christmas Card From a Hooker in Minneapolis' and 'Red Shoes by the Drugstore,' his writing became ever more vivid, compact, and complex." From the album, Waits's first single, a cover of Leonard Bernstein and Stephen Sondheim's "Somewhere" from West Side Story, was released, but failed to chart. For his Blue Valentine tour, Waits assembled a new band; he also had a gas station built as a set for his performances. His support act on the tour was Leon Redbone. In April, he embarked on a European tour, there making television appearances and press interviews; in Austria he was the subject of a short documentary. From there, he flew to Australia for his first tour of that country before returning to Los Angeles in May.

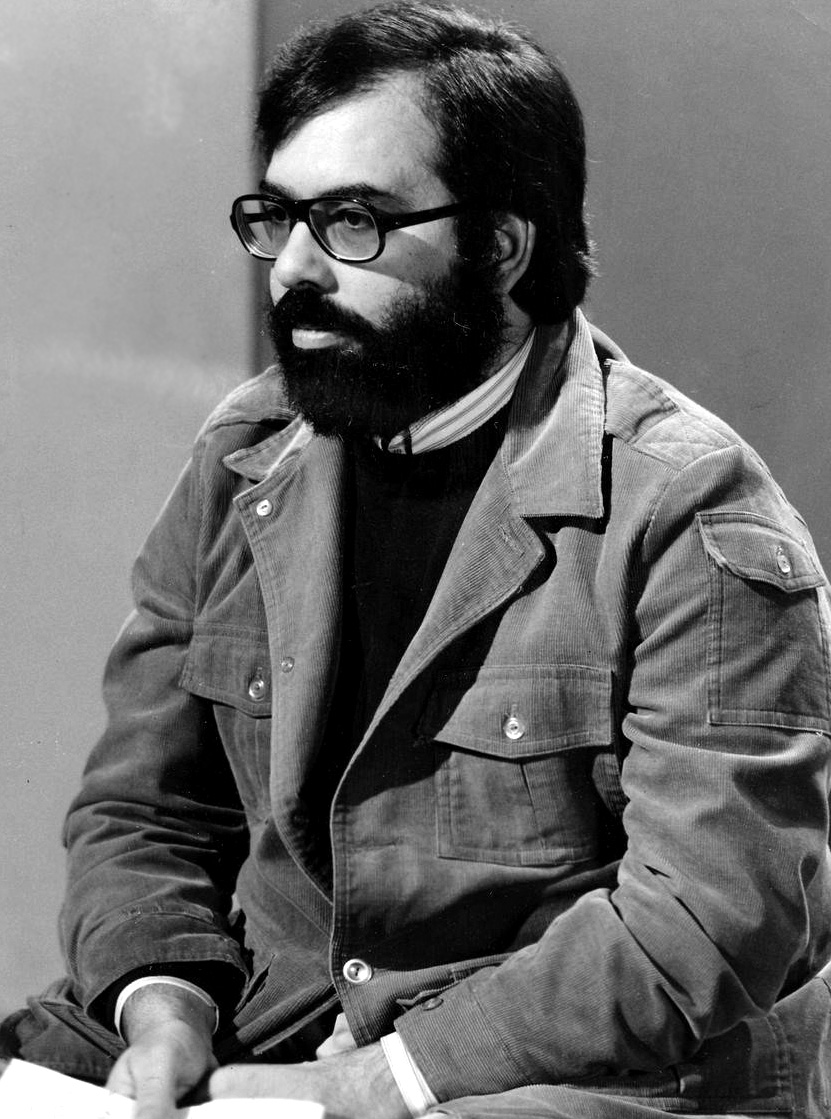
Francis Ford Coppola (pictured in 1976) convinced Waits to leave New York City and return to Los Angeles to score his film One from the Heart.

Waits was dissatisfied with Elektra-Asylum, who he felt had lost interest in him as an artist in favor of their more commercially successful acts like the Eagles, Linda Ronstadt, Carly Simon and Queen. After a phone call with their mutual friend Chuck E. Weiss, Waits told Jones, "Chuck E.'s in love". This was the inspiration for her song "Chuck E.'s in Love". Jones's musical career was taking off; after an appearance on Saturday Night Live, "Chuck E.'s In Love" reached No. 4 on the singles chart, straining her relationship with Waits. Their relationship was further damaged by Jones's heroin addiction. Waits joined Jones for the first leg of her European tour, but then ended his relationship with her. Her grief at the breakup was channeled into the 1981 album Pirates. In September, Waits moved to Crenshaw Boulevard to be closer to his father, before relocating to New York City. He initially lived in the Chelsea Hotel before renting an apartment on West 26th Street. On arriving in the city, he told a reporter that he "just needed a new urban landscape. I've always wanted to live here. It's a good working atmosphere for me". He considered writing a Broadway musical based on Thornton Wilder's Our Town. A rotoscoped Waits performed "The One That Got Away" in the music video Tom Waits For No One (1979).

Francis Ford Coppola asked Waits to return to Los Angeles to write a soundtrack for his forthcoming film, One from the Heart. Waits was excited but conflicted by the prospect; Coppola wanted him to create music akin to his early work, a genre that he was trying to leave behind, and thus he characterized the project as an artistic "step backwards". He nevertheless returned to Los Angeles to work on the soundtrack in a room set aside for the purpose in Coppola's Hollywood studios. This style of working was new to Waits; he later recalled that he was "so insecure when I started ... I was sweating buckets". Waits was nominated for the 1982 Academy Award for Original Music Score.

Waits still contractually owed Elektra-Asylum another album, so he took a break from Coppola's project to write an album that he initially called White Spades. He recorded the album in June; it was released in September as Heartattack and Vine. The album was more guitar-based and had, according to Humphries, "a harder R&B edge" than any of its predecessors. It again broke into the Top 100 Album Chart, peaking at No. 96. Reviews were generally good. Hoskyns called it "one of Waits's pinnacle achievements" as an album. One of its tracks, "Jersey Girl", was subsequently recorded by Bruce Springsteen. Waits was grateful, both for the revenue that the cover brought him and because he felt appreciated by a songwriter he admired. While on the set of One from the Heart, Waits encountered Kathleen Brennan, a young Irish-American woman working as an assistant story editor. The two had previously met while Waits was filming Paradise Alley. Waits would later describe this encounter with Brennan as "love at first sight"; they were engaged to be married within a week. In August 1980, they married at a 24-hour wedding chapel on Manchester Boulevard in Watts before honeymooning in Tralee, a town in County Kerry, Ireland, where Brennan had family.

=== Swordfishtrombones and New York City: 1980–1984 ===
A whip and a chair. The Bible. The Book of Revelations. She grew up Catholic, you know, blood and liquor and guilt. She pulverizes me so that I don't just write the same song over and over again. Which is what a lot of people do, including myself.

— Waits on what his wife brought to his creative process

Returning to Los Angeles, Waits and Brennan moved into a Union Avenue apartment. Hoskyns noted that with Brennan, "Waits had found the stabilizing, nurturing companion he'd always wanted", and that she brought him "a sense of emotional security he had never known" before. At the same time, many of his old friends felt cut off after his marriage. Waits said of Brennan: "She rescued me. Maybe I rescued her too; that's often how it works. Upshot is that we both got into the same leaky boat. Maybe the weight drags it down, because now you've two people sitting in it. Sorry, baby! But on the other hand you've also got two peoples' imagination to patch it up again. Everybody knows she's the brains behind Pa, as Dylan might have said. I'm just the figurehead. She's the one who's steering the ship."

Recording of Waits's One from the Heart soundtrack began in October 1980 and continued until September 1981. A number of the tracks were recorded as duets with Crystal Gayle; Waits had initially planned to duet with Midler but she proved unavailable. The film was released in 1982 to largely poor reviews. Waits makes a small cameo as a trumpet player in a crowd scene. Waits's soundtrack album was released by Columbia Records in 1982. Waits had misgivings about the album, thinking it was over-produced. Humphries thought that working with Coppola was an important move in Waits's career: it "led directly to Waits moving from cult (i.e. largely unknown) artiste to center-stage."

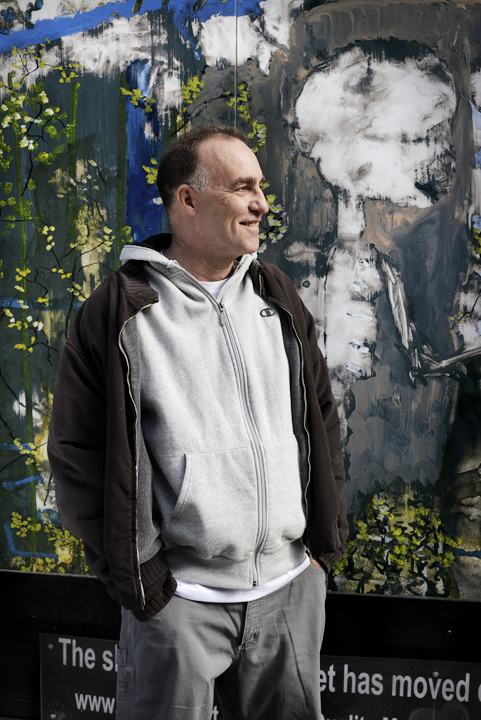
In New York City, Waits shared a workspace with jazz musician John Lurie (pictured in 2013).

Newly married and with his Elektra-Asylum contract completed, Waits decided that it was time to artistically reinvent himself. He wanted to move away from using Howe as his producer, although the two parted on good terms. With Brennan's help, he began the process of firing Cohen as his manager, with Waits and Brennan taking on managerial responsibilities themselves. He came to believe that Cohen had been swindling him out of much of his earnings, later relating that "I thought I was a millionaire and it turned out I had, like, twenty bucks." Waits credited Brennan with introducing him to much new music, most notably Captain Beefheart, a key influence on the direction in which he wanted to take his work. He later said that "once you've heard Beefheart it's hard to wash him out of your clothes. It stains, like coffee or blood." She also introduced him to Harry Partch, a composer who created his own instruments out of everyday materials. Waits began to use images rather than moods or characters as the basis for his songs.

I like to imagine how it feels for the object to become music. Imagine you're the lid to a fifty-gallon drum. That's your job. You work at that. That's your whole life. Then one day I find you and I say, "We're gonna drill a hole in you, run a wire through you, hang you from the ceiling of the studio, bang on you with a mallet, and now you're in show business, baby!"

— Waits on his unique use of instruments

Waits wrote the songs for Swordfishtrombones during a two-week trip to Ireland. He recorded it at Sunset Sound studios and produced it himself; Brennan often attended the sessions and gave him advice. Swordfishtrombones abandoned the jazz sound characteristic of his earlier work; it was his first album not to feature a saxophone and his first to feature the marimba. When the album was finished, he took it to Asylum, but they declined to release it. Waits wanted to leave the label; in his view: "They liked dropping my name in terms of me being a 'prestige' artist, but when it came down to it they didn't invest a whole lot in me in terms of faith". Chris Blackwell of Island Records learned of Waits' dissatisfaction and approached him, offering to release Swordfishtrombones; Island had a reputation for signing more experimental acts, such as King Crimson, Roxy Music and Sparks. Waits did not tour to promote the album, partly because Brennan was pregnant. Although unenthusiastic about the new trend for music videos, he appeared in one for the song "In the Neighborhood", co-directed by Haskell Wexler and Michael A. Russ. Russ also designed the Swordfishtrombones album cover, featuring an image of Waits with Lee Kolima, a circus strongman, and Angelo Rossitto, a dwarf.

Jon Pareles wrote that "On Swordfishtrombones, Waits has made a breakthrough–he's found music as evocative as his words. Waits's grumble of a voice now bounces off a peculiar assortment of horns and percussion and organ and keyboards, as if he'd led a Salvation Army band into a broken-down Hong Kong disco. It's as if he's shifted from monologues to screenplays." According to David Smay, Swordfishtrombones was "the record where Tom Waits radically reinvented himself and reshaped the musical landscape." NME named it the second best album of the year. In 1989, Spin magazine named it the second greatest album of all time.

In 1983, Waits appeared in three more Coppola films: as Benny, a philosopher running a billboard store in Rumble Fish; as Buck Merrill in The Outsiders; and as the maître'd in The Cotton Club. He later said that "Coppola is actually the only film director in Hollywood that has a conscience... most of them are egomaniacs and money-grabbing bastards". In September, Brennan gave birth to their daughter, Kellesimone. Waits was determined to keep his family life separate from his public image and to spend as much time as possible with his daughter. With Brennan and their child, Waits moved to New York City to be closer to Brennan's parents and Island's U.S. office. They settled into a loft apartment near Union Square.

Waits found New York City life frustrating, although it allowed him to meet many new musicians and artists. He befriended John Lurie of the Lounge Lizards, and the duo began sharing a music studio in the Westbeth artist-community building in Greenwich Village. He began networking in the city's arts scene and, at a party Jean-Michel Basquiat held for Lurie, he met the filmmaker Jim Jarmusch.

=== Rain Dogs and Franks Wild Years: 1985–1988 ===
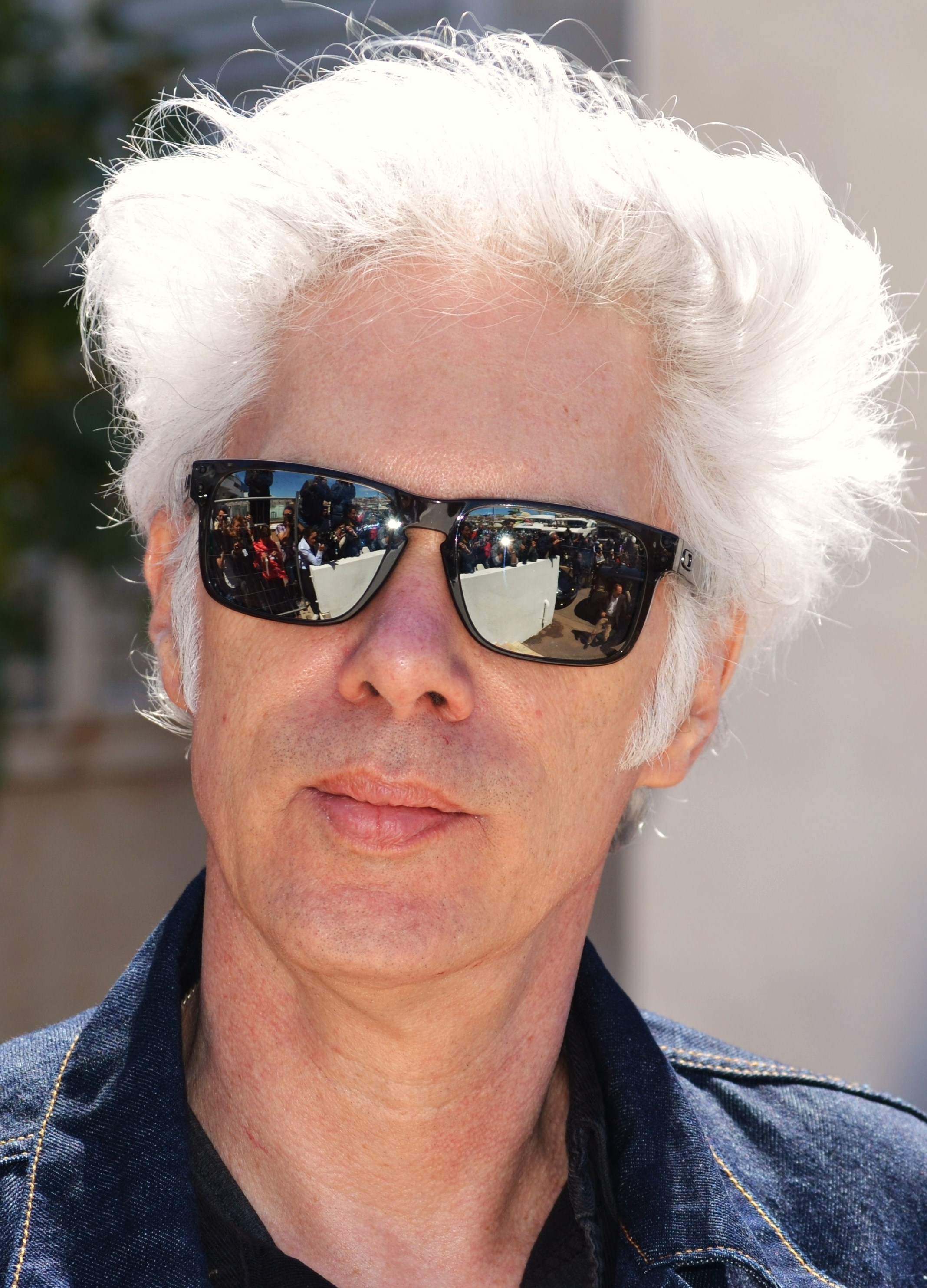
Waits appeared in several films by Jim Jarmusch (pictured in 2013).

Starting in the mid-'80s, Kurt Weill became an important influence on Waits's work. Bowman writes that "Waits had become interested in Weill's late-1920s and 1930s musical-theater works... Weill's slightly off-kilter, stylized cabaret approach to melody, rhythm, orchestration, and musical narrative permeated much of Waits' later work." Waits did the soundtrack for the documentary Streetwise, about homeless youth in Seattle; it was another influence on the subjects of his next album. Rain Dogs was recorded at the RCA Studios in mid 1985. Musically, Waits called the album "kind of an interaction between Appalachia and Nigeria". Keith Richards played on several tracks; Richards later acknowledged Waits's encouragement of his debut solo album, Talk is Cheap. Rain Dogs also marked Marc Ribot's debut as a session guitarist; he played on many later Waits albums. Jean-Baptiste Mondino directed a music video of "Downtown Train" featuring boxer Jake LaMotta. The song was subsequently covered by Patty Smyth in 1987, and later by Rod Stewart, where it reached the Top 5 in 1990. In 1985, Rolling Stone named Waits its "Songwriter of the Year". Arion Berger wrote that "With Rain Dogs, he dropped his bedraggled lounge-piano act and fused outsider influences–socialist decadence by way of Kurt Weill, pre-rock integrity from old dirty blues, the elegiac melancholy of New Orleans funeral brass–into a singularly idiosyncratic American style... The music is bony and menacingly beautiful, the desultory electric-guitar solo as cold as the rattle of marimbas in 'Clap Hands'. The evocative, elliptical rhymes describe scenes and characters with poetic precision but use atmosphere, not narrative, to connect them." NME named Rain Dogs the best album of the year.

In September 1985, his son Casey was born. Waits assembled a band and went on tour, kicking it off in Scotland in October before proceeding around Europe and then the U.S. He changed the setlist for each performance; most of the songs chosen were from his two Island albums. Returning to the U.S., he traveled to New Orleans to act in Jarmusch's Down by Law. Jarmusch wrote Down by Law with Waits and Lurie in mind. The film opened and closed with songs from Rain Dogs. Jarmusch noted that "Tom and I have a kindred aesthetic. An interest in unambitious people, marginal people." The pair developed a friendship; Waits called Jarmusch "Dr. Sullen", while Jarmusch called Waits "The Prince of Melancholy".

Waits had devised a musical, Franks Wild Years, loosely based on "Frank's Wild Years" from Swordfishtrombones. In late 1985, he reached an agreement that the play would be performed by the Steppenwolf Theatre Company in Chicago's Briar Street Theatre Waits starred as Frank, whom he described as

Quite a guy. Grew up in a bird's eye frozen, oven-ready, rural American town where Bing, Bob, Dean, Wayne & Jerry are considered major constellations. Frank, mistakenly, thinks he can stuff himself into their shorts and present himself to an adoring world. He is a combination of Will Rogers and Mark Twain, playing accordion–but without the wisdom they possessed. He has a poet's heart and a boy's sense of wonder with the world. A legend in Rainville since he burned his house down and took off for the Big Time.

Reviews were generally positive. He had initially considered a run in New York City but decided against it. The songs from the show were recorded for his ninth studio album, Franks Wild Years, and released by Island Records in 1987. NME ranked Franks Wild Years fifth on its list of albums of the year. The album was Waits's first collaboration with David Hidalgo, who played accordion on "Cold, Cold Ground" and "Train Song". After its release, Waits toured North America and Europe, his last full tour for two decades. Two of the performances were the basis for Chris Blum's concert film Big Time (1988).

Waits continued interacting and working with other artists he admired. He was a great fan of The Pogues and went on a Chicago pub crawl with them in 1986. In 1987, he appeared as a master of ceremonies on several dates of Elvis Costello's "Wheel of Fortune" tour.

At rehearsals, Tom Waits looked like any moment he might break at the waist or his head fall off his shoulders on to the floor. I once saw a small-town idiot walking across the park, totally drunk, but he was holding an ice-cream, staggering, but also concentrating on not allowing the ice-cream to fall. I felt there was something similar to Tom.

— Jack Nicholson, Waits's co-star in Ironweed

In 1986, he took a small part in Candy Mountain, as millionaire golf enthusiast Al Silk. He costarred in Hector Babenco's Ironweed, as Rudy the Kraut. Hoskyns noted that Ironweed put Waits "on the mainstream Hollywood map as a character actor". In Fall 1987, Waits and his family left New York and returned to Los Angeles, settling on Union Avenue. He appeared as a hitman in Robert Dornhelm's Cold Feet and lent his voice to Jarmusch's Mystery Train.

Although Waits had provided a voice-over for a 1981 television advert for Butcher's Blend dog food, he objected to musicians letting companies use their songs in advertising; he said that "artists who take money for ads poison and pervert their songs". In November 1988, he brought a lawsuit against Frito-Lay for using an impersonator performing "Step Right Up" in an advertisement for Doritos; it came to court in April 1990, and Waits won the case in 1992. He received a $2.6 million settlement, a sum larger than his earnings from all of his previous albums combined. This earned him and Brennan reputations as tireless adversaries.

=== The Black Rider, Bone Machine, and Alice: 1989–1998 ===
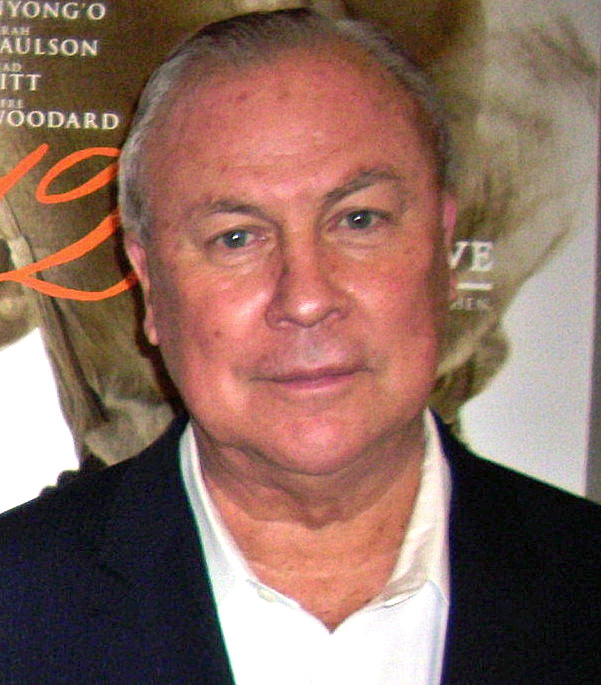
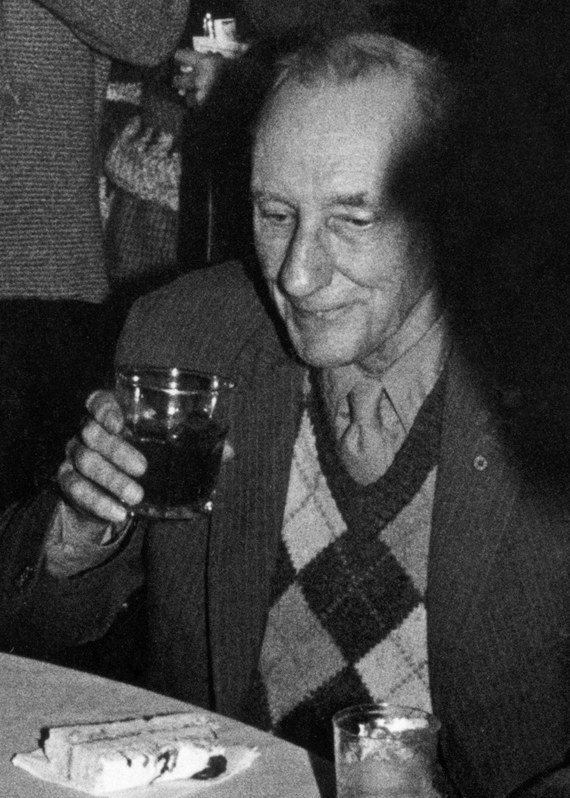
Waits collaborated with Robert Wilson (left) and William S. Burroughs (right) on The Black Rider.

In 1989, Waits began planning a collaboration with Robert Wilson, a theater director he had known throughout the 1980s. Their project was the "cowboy opera" The Black Rider. It was based on a German folk tale, the Freischütz, which had inspired Carl Maria von Weber's opera Der Freischütz (1821). In 2004, Waits related that "Wilson is my teacher. There's nobody that's affected me that much as an artist". Waits wrote the music and, at the suggestion of Allen Ginsberg, Waits and Wilson approached William S. Burroughs to pen the lyrics. They flew to Kansas to meet with Burroughs, who agreed to join the project. Waits traveled to Hamburg, Germany in May 1989 to work on the project, and was later joined there by Burroughs. The Black Rider debuted in Hamburg's Thalia Theater in March 1990. On completing its run at the Thalia, the play went on an international tour, with a second run of performances occurring in the mid-2000s.

In June 1989, Waits traveled to London to play a Punch and Judy puppeteer in Ann Guedes's film Bearskin: An Urban Fairytale. He proceeded to Ireland, where he was joined by Brennan and spent time with her family. In December 1989, he began a stint as Curly, a mobster's son, at the Los Angeles Theatre Center production of Thomas Babe's play Demon Wine. Over the next four years, he made seven film appearances. He nevertheless repeatedly told press that he did not see himself as an actor, but only as someone who did some acting. He made a brief appearance as a plainclothes cop in The Two Jakes (1990) and played a disabled war veteran in Terry Gilliam's The Fisher King (1991). He had a cameo in Steve Rash's Queens Logic (1991) and played a pilot-for-hire in Héctor Babenco's At Play in the Fields of the Lord (1991). He appeared as himself fishing with John Lurie on Fishing with John. He was Renfield in Coppola's Bram Stoker's Dracula (1992). Waits starred as Earl Piggot, an alcoholic limousine driver, in Robert Altman's Short Cuts (1993). Hoskyns said that this "may be the best performance Waits ever gave as an actor."

In 1991, Waits and his family moved to the outskirts of Sonoma. Waits's family later moved to a secluded house near Valley Ford after a bypass road was built near to their first Sonoma County house. Also in 1991, 13 of Waits's 1971 pre-Asylum Records recordings were released for the first time on the first volume of Tom Waits: The Early Years. Waits was angered at this, describing many of his early demos as "baby pictures" that he would not want released. A second volume with 13 more recordings from 1971 was released in 1993. In April 1992, Waits released the soundtrack album to Jarmusch's Night on Earth. Largely instrumental, it had been recorded at the Prairie Sun studio in Cotati. In 1992, Waits quit drinking alcohol and joined Alcoholics Anonymous. In the early 1990s he took part in several charitable causes. In 1990 he contributed a song to the HIV/AIDS benefit album Red Hot + Blue and later appeared at a Wiltern Theater fundraising show for the victims of the 1992 Los Angeles riots.

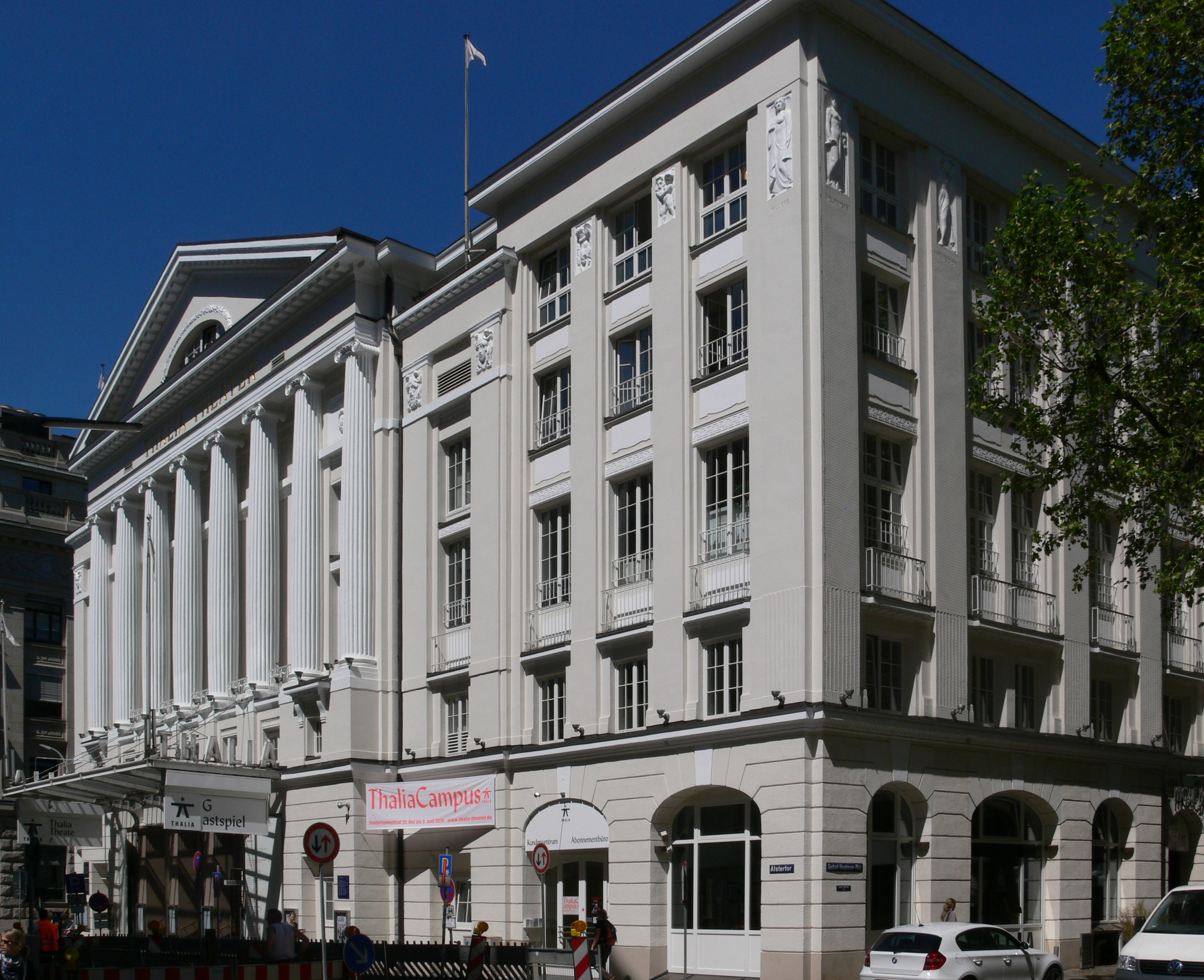
The Thalia in Hamburg, where The Black Rider and Alice were first performed

In August 1992, Waits released his tenth studio album, Bone Machine. Waits wanted to explore "more machinery sounds" with the album, reflecting his interest in industrial music. It was recorded in an old storage room at Prairie Sun. Waits recalled, "I found a great room to work in, it's just a cement floor and a hot water heater. Okay, we'll do it here. It's got some good echo." Eight of the album's tracks were co-written with Brennan. The cover was co-designed by Waits and Jesse Dylan. Jarmusch and Dylan directed videos for "I Don't Wanna Grow Up", and "Goin' Out West", respectively. Critic Steve Huey called it "perhaps Tom Waits's most cohesive album... a morbid, sinister nightmare, one that applied the quirks of his experimental '80s classics to stunningly evocative—and often harrowing—effect... Waits's most affecting and powerful recording, even if it isn't his most accessible." The album's closing track, "That Feel", was co-written with Keith Richards. Bone Machine won the Grammy for Best Alternative Music Album; in response, Waits asked Jarmusch: "alternative to what?!"

Waits decided to record an album of the songs written for The Black Rider, and did so at Los Angeles's Sunset Sound Factory. The Black Rider was released in the fall of 1993. Waits and Wilson decided to collaborate again, this time on an operatic treatment of Lewis Carroll's relationship with Alice Liddell, who had provided the inspiration for Alice in Wonderland and Through the Looking Glass. Again scheduled to premier at the Thalia, they began working on the project in Hamburg in early 1992. Waits characterized the songs he wrote for the play as "adult songs for children, or children's songs for adults". In his lyrics, Waits drew on his increasing interest in freak shows and the physically deformed. He thought the play itself was about "repression, mental illness and obsessive, compulsive disorders". Alice premiered at the Thalia in December 1992.

In early 1993, Brennan was pregnant with Waits's third child, Sullivan. He decided to reduce his workload to spend more time with his children; this isolation spawned rumours that he was seriously ill or had separated from his wife. For three years, he turned down all offers to perform gigs or appear in movies. However, he made several cameos and guest appearances on albums by musicians he admired. In February 1996, he held a benefit performance to raise funds for the legal defense of his friend Don Hyde, who had been charged with distributing LSD. He wrote "Walk Away" and "The Fall of Troy" for the soundtrack of Dead Man Walking (1995) and "Little Drop of Poison" for The End of Violence (1997). In 1998, Island released Beautiful Maladies, a compilation of 23 Waits tracks from his albums with the company, selected by Waits himself.

=== Mule Variations and Woyzeck: 1999–2003 ===
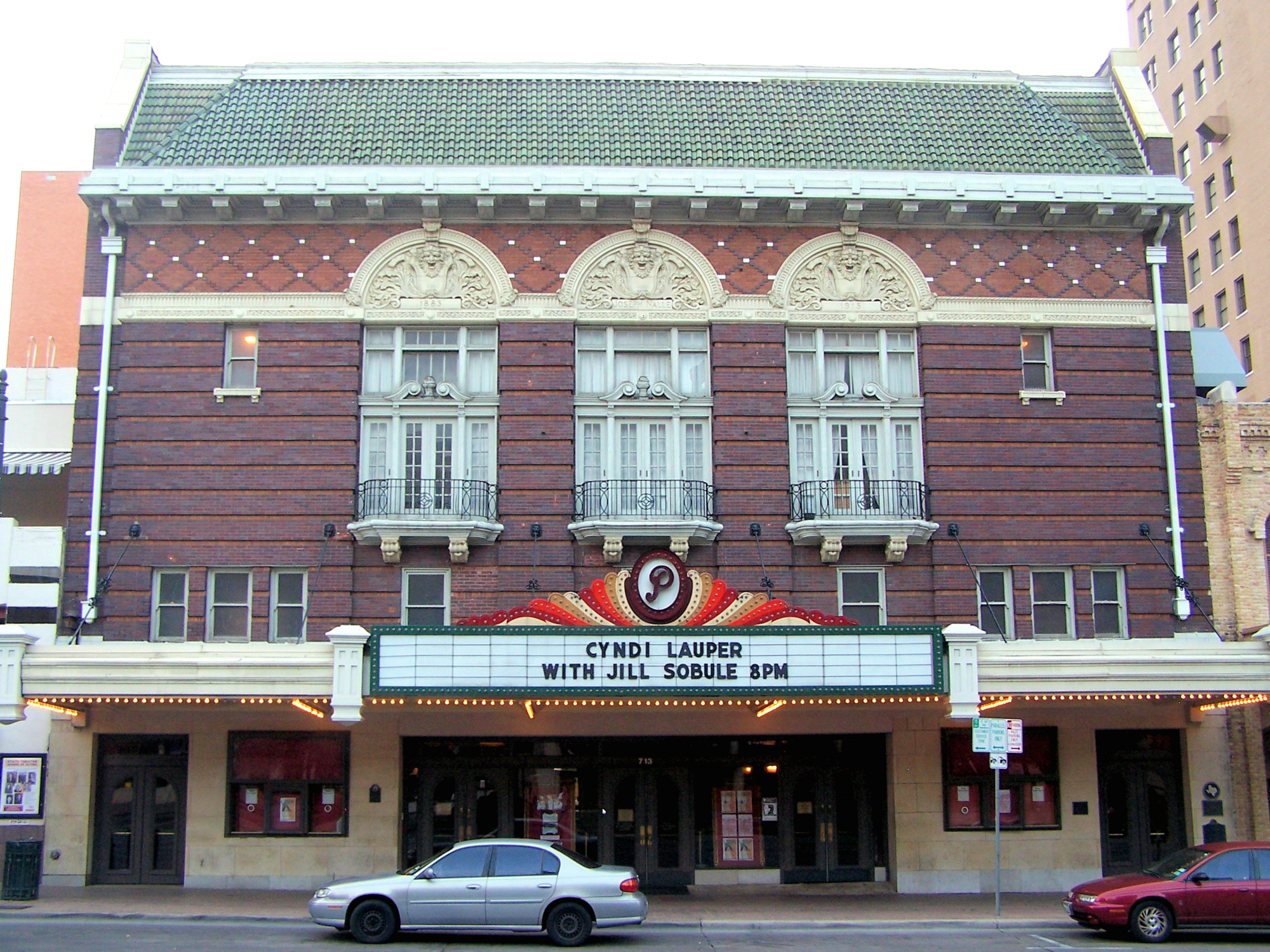
In March 1999, Waits performed at the Paramount Theater in Austin, Texas.

After his contract with Island expired, Waits decided not to try to renew it, particularly as Blackwell had resigned from the company. He signed to a smaller record label, Anti-, recently launched as an offshoot of the punk-label Epitaph Records. He described the company as "a friendly place". The president of Anti-, Andy Kaulkin, said the label was "blown away that Tom would even consider us. We are huge fans." Waits himself praised the label: "Epitaph is a label run by and for artists and musicians, where it feels much more like a partnership than a plantation... We shook on the deal over a coffee in a truck stop. I know it's going to be an adventure."

In March 1999, Anti- released Mule Variations. Waits had been recording the tracks at Prairie Sun since June 1998. The tracks often dealt with themes involving rural life in the United States and were influenced by the early blues recordings made by Alan Lomax; Waits coined the term "surrural" ("surreal" and "rural") to describe the album's content. Mule Variations reached No. 30 on the U.S. Billboard 200, the highest showing of a Waits album. The album was well received, being named "Album of the Year" by Mojo. It won the Grammy Award for Best Contemporary Folk Album. On the categorization of the album as folk music, Waits said: "That's not a bad thing to be called if you've got to be in some kind of category."

Also in March 1999, Waits gave his first live show in three years at Paramount Theater, Austin, Texas as part of the South by Southwest festival. He then appeared in an episode of VH1 Storytellers. In the later part of the year he embarked on the Mule Variations tour, primarily in the U.S. but also featuring dates in Berlin. In October, he performed at Neil Young's annual Bridge School benefit concert. In 1999, he appeared in Kinka Usher's comic book spoof Mystery Men as Dr. A. Heller, an eccentric inventor living in an abandoned amusement park.

In 2000, Waits began writing songs for Wilson's adaptation of Georg Büchner's Woyzeck, which had earlier inspired Alban Berg's opera Wozzeck (1925). It was scheduled to start at the Betty Nansen Theater in Copenhagen in November 2000. He initially worked on the songs at home before traveling to Copenhagen for rehearsals in October. Waits said that he liked the play because it was "a proletariat story ... about a poor soldier who is manipulated by the government". He decided to then record the songs he had written for both Alice and Woyzeck, placing them on separate albums. For these recordings, he brought in a range of jazz and avant-garde musicians from San Francisco. The two albums, Alice and Blood Money, were released simultaneously in May 2002. Alice entered the U.S. album chart at No. 32 and Blood Money at No. 33, his highest charting positions at that time. Waits described Alice as being "more metaphysical or something, maybe more water, more feminine", while Blood Money was "more earthbound, more carnival, more the slaving meat-wheel that we're all on". Of the two, Alice was better received by critics. Jesse Dylan directed a video for "God's Away On Business", but shooting was delayed when the emus who were set to star were eaten by coyotes. Per NME, "Replacements were hastily found and the video for 'God's Away On Business', the single lifted from 'Blood Money', one of Waits' two new albums, went ahead a little late."

In May 2001, Waits accepted a Founders Award at the 18th annual American Society of Composers, Authors and Publishers (ASCAP) Pop Music Awards in a ceremony at the Beverly Hilton Hotel in Beverly Hills, California. That same month, he joined singers Nancy and Ann Wilson of Heart, as well as Randy Newman, in launching a $40 million lawsuit against mp3.com for copyright infringement. In September 2002, he appeared at a hearing on accounting practices within the music industry in California. There, he expressed satisfaction with Anti- but declared more broadly that "the record companies are like cartels. It's a nightmare to be trapped in one."

In September 2003, Waits performed at the Healing the Divide fundraiser in New York City. He appeared in Jarmusch's Coffee and Cigarettes (2003), having a conversation with Iggy Pop.

=== Real Gone and Orphans: 2004–2011 ===
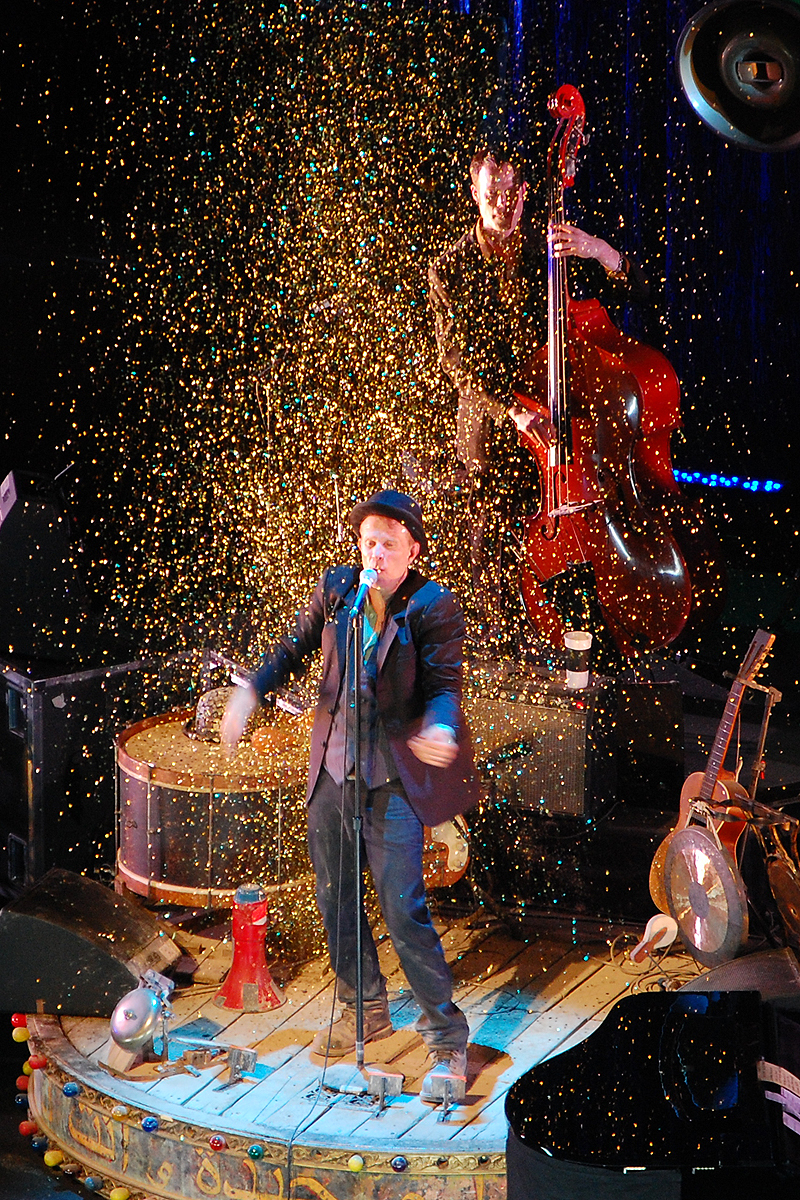
Waits performing in Prague on his Glitter and Doom Tour, July 2008

In 2004, Waits released his fifteenth studio album, Real Gone. He had recorded it in an abandoned schoolhouse in Locke. Hoskyns called the album Waits' "roughest, most unkempt music to date". It incorporated Waits beatboxing, a technique he had picked up from his growing interest in hip-hop. Humphries characterized it as "the most overtly political album of Waits' career". It featured three political songs expressing Waits' anger at the presidency of George W. Bush and the Iraq War. He said: "I'm not a politician. I keep my mouth shut because I don't want to put my foot in it. But at a certain point, saying absolutely nothing is a political statement of its own." Real Gone received largely positive reviews. It made the Billboard Top 30 as well as the Top 10 in several European album charts, also earning him a nomination for Best International Male Solo Artist at the 2005 Brit Awards. In October 2004, he launched a tour in Vancouver before heading to Europe, where his shows were sell-outs: his only London gig saw 78,000 applications for around 3,700 available tickets. Per Bowman, "Much of Real Gone was built around oral-percussion home recordings that Waits made in his bathroom, using his mouth as a human beat-box. A superb example is the bed track underpinning the hellacious groove of 'Metropolitan Glide' that Waits aptly described as 'cubist funk.' In stark contrast, the album's closing track, 'Day After Tomorrow,' returned Waits to his singer-songwriter roots, and features a beautiful melody that sounds eerily similar to Dylan's early acoustic work."

After several years without film appearances, he played a gun-toting Seventh-day Adventist in Tony Scott's Domino (2005). Later in 2005, he traveled to Italy to appear in Benigni's The Tiger and the Snow. Next Waits was in Wristcutters: A Love Story (2007) performing as an angel posing as a tramp. In the summer of 2006, he embarked on his "Orphans" tour of southern and midwest states. His son Casey played in the band accompanying him on tour. In 2006, Waits issued Orphans: Brawlers, Bawlers & Bastards, a 54-song three-disc box set of rarities, unreleased tracks and new compositions; he said that the music is "songs that fell behind the stove while making dinner." The first disc, Brawlers, consists of raucous rock and blues-based numbers; the second, Bawlers, of melancholic country songs and ballads; the third, Bastards, of stories, spoken word pieces and other works not so easily categorized. Orphans made the top ten in several European charts. In 2006, Waits was a guest on The Daily Show with Jon Stewart, where he played "Day After Tomorrow".

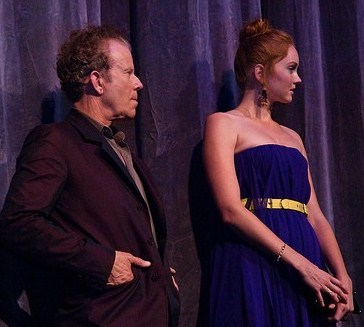
Waits next to Lily Cole at the premiere for The Imaginarium of Doctor Parnassus at the 2009 Toronto International Film Festival

In January 2008, Waits performed at a benefit for Bet Tzedek Legal Services—The House of Justice, a nonprofit poverty law center, in Los Angeles. That year, Waits embarked on his Glitter and Doom Tour, starting in the U.S. and moving to Europe. Both of his sons played with him on the tour. At the June concert in El Paso, Texas, Waits was presented with the key to the city. In 2009, he released the two-disc Glitter and Doom Live. He continued acting, playing Mr Nick in Gilliam's The Imaginarium of Doctor Parnassus (2009) and Engineer in The Book of Eli (2010), a post-apocalyptic film by the Hughes brothers.

Waits found himself in a situation similar to his earlier one with Frito Lay in 2000 when Audi approached him, asking to use "Innocent When You Dream" for a commercial broadcast in Spain. Waits declined, but the commercial ultimately featured music very similar to that song. Waits undertook legal action, and a Spanish court recognized that there had been a violation of Waits's moral rights in addition to the infringement of copyright. The production company, Tandem Campmany Guasch, was ordered to pay compensation to Waits through his Spanish publisher. Waits later joked that they got the name of the song wrong, thinking it was called "Innocent When You Scheme". In 2005, Waits sued Adam Opel AG, claiming that, after having failed to sign him to sing in their Scandinavian commercials, they had hired a sound-alike singer. In 2007, the suit was settled, and Waits gave his proceeds to charity.

=== Bad as Me and later work: 2011–present ===
In 2010, Waits was reported to be working on a new stage musical with director and long-time collaborator Robert Wilson and playwright Martin McDonagh.

In early 2011, Waits completed a set of 23 poems, Seeds on Hard Ground, which were inspired by Michael O'Brien's portraits of the homeless in his book, Hard Ground. O'Brien's book included the poems alongside the portraits. In anticipation of the book release, Waits and Anti- printed limited edition chapbooks of the poems to raise money for Redwood Empire Food Bank, a homeless referral and family support service in Sonoma County, California. As of January 26, 2011, four editions, each limited to 1,000 copies, sold out, raising $90,000 for the food bank. On February 24, 2011, it was announced via Waits's official website that he had begun work on his next studio album. Waits said through his website that on August 23 he would "set the record straight" in regards to rumors of a new release. On August 23, the title of the new album was revealed to be Bad as Me, and the lead single and title track started being offered via Amazon.com and other sites.

In March 2011, Waits was inducted into the Rock and Roll Hall of Fame by Neil Young.

Since 2012, though not having made any formal announcement of retreating from a musical career, Waits has focused much of his artistic energy on poetry and acting. He has not toured as a musician or performed a full-length concert since 2008, and issued no new music after 2011, until he released a single, "Boots on the Ground" in 2026. However, Waits still performs music occasionally, as there have been a very few widely spaced appearances by Waits as a musical performer at various events in the 2010s and 2020s, wherein he typically performs between one and three songs.

In 2012, Waits had a supporting role in McDonagh's crime comedy Seven Psychopaths as a retired serial killer. In 2013, he lent his voice to The Simpsons episode "Homer Goes to Prep School" as a survivalist. On May 5, 2013, he joined the Rolling Stones on stage at the Oracle Arena in Oakland, California, to duet with Mick Jagger on Willie Dixon's "Little Red Rooster". On October 27, 2013, Waits performed at the 27th annual Bridge School Benefit concert in Mountain View California; Rolling Stone called his performance a "triumph".

Over the years, Waits made six appearances on the Late Show with David Letterman, and on May 14, 2015, sang "Take One Last Look" on the show's fifth to last broadcast. He was accompanied by Larry Taylor on upright bass and Gabriel Donohue on piano accordion, with the horn section of the CBS Orchestra. In 2016, Waits pursued litigation against French artist Bartabas, who had used several of his songs as a backdrop to a theatrical performance. Claims and counterclaims were made, with Bartabas claiming to have sought and been granted permission to use the material (and to have paid $400,000 for the privilege) but with Waits claiming that his identity had been stolen. The court ruled in Bartabas's favor, and the circus performance was allowed to continue, although the threat of further litigation meant that it was not performed outside France and the resulting DVD release does not contain Waits's material.

In 2018, Waits had a feature role in The Ballad of Buster Scruggs, a Western anthology film by the Coen brothers, as the Prospector. Also in 2018, Waits provided the recorded narration for performances of McDonagh's play A Very Very Very Dark Matter, which was performed at the Bridge Theatre, London. In 2021, Waits had a supporting role in Paul Thomas Anderson's coming-of-age film Licorice Pizza. In 2023, he joined Iggy Pop on the Confidential Show, where they swapped stories and songs. In 2025, he appeared as part of Italian public television channel RAI3's The Human Factor series in the last episode, "The Last Ride", where he read from his poetry book "Seeds On Hard Ground", and performed a few of his songs. On 12 March 2026, it was revealed that Waits would appear on an upcoming tribute album to Shane MacGowan and The Pogues titled 20th Century Paddy – The Songs of Shane MacGowan, marking his first new studio recording since 2018.

In April 2026, Waits and British trip hop act Massive Attack released a new single "Boots on the Ground", a protest song and Waits' first original music since 2011. The song had been recorded some years prior. In July, Waits released the spoken-word track "The Fly", intended as the B side to the song from earlier that year.

== Musical style ==
Tom Waits has taken influence from a wide variety of different artists and styles from across time. In his early career, he took influence from Bob Dylan's folk music and the pre-war composers Irving Berlin, Cole Porter, and Hoagy Carmichael. Frank Sinatra and the 1940s and 1950s word-jazz and poetry of Beat and Beat-influenced writers such as Jack Kerouac, Lord Buckley and Charles Bukowski were a big influence on his albums in the 1970s. By 1982, his musical style shifted away from a lot of these earlier influences and took inspiration from a wider array of sources. Influences included the Rolling Stones, avant-garde composer Harry Partch, Howlin' Wolf and Captain Beefheart's late-1960s experimental rock.

In addition to Kerouac and Bukowski, literary influences include Nelson Algren, John Rechy and Hubert Selby Jr. Bowman notes the influence of crime writers like Dashiell Hammett and John D. Macdonald. Waits says that "for a songwriter, Dylan is as essential as a hammer and nails and saw are to a carpenter." Musical influences include Randy Newman and Dr. John. He has praised Merle Haggard: "Want to learn how to write songs? Listen to Merle Haggard." He is an opera lover; he recalls hearing Puccini's "Nessun dorma" "in the kitchen at Coppola's with Raul Julia one night, and it changed my life, that particular Aria. I had never heard it. He asked me if I had ever heard it, and I said no, and he was like, as if I said I've never had spaghetti and meatballs - 'Oh My God, Oh My God!'-and he grabbed me and he brought me into the jukebox (there was a jukebox in the kitchen) and he put that on and he just kind of left me there. It was like giving a cigar to a five-year old." A jazz influence is Thelonious Monk: "He almost sounded like a kid taking piano lessons. I could relate to that when I first started playing the piano, because he was decomposing the music while he was playing it." One of Waits's own favorite descriptions of his vocal style was "Louis Armstrong and Ethel Merman meeting in Hell."

He is known for his eclectic use of instruments, some of his own devising. On Swordfishtrombones, his orchestration included talking drums, bagpipes, banjo, bass marimba and glass harmonica; on Rain Dogs, accordion and harmonium; on Franks Wild Years, glockenspiel, Mellotron, Farfisa and Optigan; on Bone Machine and Mule Variations, the Chamberlin; on The Black Rider, the singing saw; on Alice, the Stroh violin; on Blood Money, a 57-whistle pneumatic calliope and an Indonesian seedpod.

Waits credits his wife with inspiration: "She's an opera buff and bug collector. And she's done a lot of things. And she has dreams like Hieronymus Bosch. She writes more from her dreams, I wrote more from the world, or from the newspaper ... And somehow it all works together." He credits her with helping him unify his eclectic musical interests: "it's really my wife that started helping me see that you can find the place where Lead Belly and Schoenberg overlap."

== Personal life ==
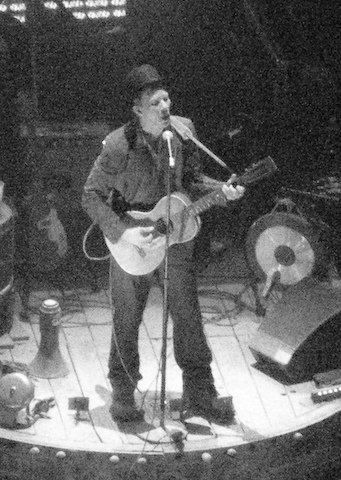
Waits performing at Le Grand Rex in Paris, July 2008

During the 1970s, Waits had a brief relationship with comedian Elayne Boosler, an intermittent relationship with Bette Midler, and a relationship with Rickie Lee Jones.

In 1980, Waits married frequent collaborator Kathleen Brennan. They live in Sonoma County, California, and have three children: Kellesimone Wylder Waits (born 1983), Casey Waits (born 1985), and Sullivan Blake Waits (born 1993). After he married and had children, Waits became increasingly reclusive. Safeguarding the privacy of his family life became very important to him.

During interviews, he has deflected questions about his personal life and refused to sanction any biography. When Barney Hoskyns was researching his unauthorized 2009 biography, Lowside of the Road: A Life of Tom Waits, Waits and his wife asked people not to talk to him. Hoskyns believed that it was Brennan who was responsible for the "wall of inaccessibility" surrounding Waits. When asked about his religious beliefs, he said, "With the God stuff I don't know. I don't know what's out there any more than anyone else."

=== Collaborations ===
Over the years, Waits has collaborated with various artists he admires. He toured with the saxophonist Teddy Edwards and played on his album Mississippi Lad (1991). Bruce Springsteen performed "Jersey Girl" with Waits on August 24, 1981, and included it on his retrospective "Live/1975–85". In 1987, he joined Springsteen, Elvis Costello, k.d. lang, and others in a tribute to Roy Orbison at Los Angeles's Ambassador Hotel, filmed as Roy Orbison and Friends: A Black and White Night. Waits and Brennan wrote "Strange Weather" for Marianne Faithfull, which she sang on her album Strange Weather in 1987. Keith Richards played on Rain Dogs, Bone Machine and Bad as Me, and Waits and Richards recorded "Shenandoah" for Son of Rogues Gallery: Pirate Ballads, Sea Songs & Chanteys (2013). Richards said of Waits: "Tom's music is so American. Probably more folk-American than anything, but somehow modern. He's a weird mixture of stuff; a great bunch of guys!" Waits wrote a poem, "Burnt Toast to Keith", for Richards's 80th birthday. Waits covered Kurt Weill's "What Keeps Mankind Alive?" from The Threepenny Opera for Hal Willner's Weill tribute album Lost in the Stars (1985) and "Heigh Ho" for his Disney-themed Stay Awake (1988). In 1991, he lent his voice to "Tommy the Cat" by Primus, and they appeared on Bone Machine and Mule Variations. Waits and Primus performed Jack Kerouac's song "On the Road" on Jack Kerouac Reads On the Road (1999). Gavin Bryars, and English composer, visited Waits in 1993 and Waits added vocals to a re-release of Bryars' Jesus' Blood Never Failed Me Yet, which was nominated for the Mercury Music Award. He sang with Ramblin' Jack Elliott on "Louise (Tell It To Me)" on his album Friends of Mine (1998). In 1998, Waits produced and funded Chuck E. Weiss's album Extremely Cool as a favor to his old friend. He produced John P. Hammond's Wicked Grin (2001) which consisted largely of covers of Waits songs, some written for the project. He covered "Return of Jackie & Judy" for We're a Happy Family: A Tribute to Ramones (2003). He appeared on Los Lobos's The Ride (2004), Eels's Blinking Lights and Other Revelations (2005) and Sparklehorse's Dreamt for Light Years in the Belly of a Mountain (2006). Ken Nordine, whose "word jazz" influenced Waits, performed "Circus" for a video with animation by Joe Coleman. Waits was one of many guests on Dan Hicks's Beatin' the Heat (2000).

== Reception and legacy ==
Bowman writes that "At the dawn of the second decade of the 21st century, Waits's influence can be seen in the work of many of the most forward-thinking contemporary artists, including Beck, PJ Harvey, and Radiohead's Thom Yorke." Other musicians who have expressed admiration for Waits's work include Elvis Costello, Bruce Springsteen, Nanci Griffith, Joe Strummer of the Clash, Michael Stipe of R.E.M., Frank Black of Pixies, and James Hetfield of Metallica. Bob Dylan, a major influence on the young Waits, called Waits one of his "secret heroes". Humphries said that he is "one of America's finest post-Dylan singer-songwriters" and, along with Edward Hopper, "one of the two great depicters of American isolation." Hoskyns called him "as important an American artist as anyone the twentieth century has produced." He notes that by the end of the twentieth century, "Waits was an iconic alternative figure, not just to the fans who'd grown up with him but to subsequent generations of music geeks", coming to be "universally acknowledged as an elder statesman of 'alternative' rock." Karen Schoemer of Newsweek said that "to the postboomer generation, he's more Dylan than Dylan. [His] melting-pot approach to Americana, his brilliant narratives and his hardiness against commercial trends have made him the ultimate icon for the alternative-minded." Steve Vai said: "Tom Waits is my favorite artist now. I completely resonate deeply with his music, his voice and his lyrics; I buy everything he ever does. He's one of those guys who are totally at one with the creative element with no excuses or concerns about what's going on around him–totally uncompromising." When asked which song she wished she had written, Florence Welch of Florence and the Machine said: "'Green Grass' by Tom Waits... Really, anything by Tom Waits. I wish I was Tom Waits. His songs are so visceral and bloody. I just love his use of imagery." Bones Howe says: "I do a lot of seminars. Occasionally I'll do something for songwriters. They all say the same thing to me. 'All the great lyrics are done.' And I say, 'I'm going to give you a lyric that you never heard before'", the following from "Tom Traubert's Blues": "A battered old suitcase to a hotel someplace / And a wound that will never heal." Howe calls this "the work of an extremely talented lyricist, poet, whatever you want to say. That is brilliant, brilliant work. And he never mentions the person, but you see the person."

I've seen him standing in a bunch of dust, and I thought I saw sparkly things coming off of him. I looked at him when he was singing and I said, "Is my vision going? I'm seeing three, maybe four people up there?" And they all seem to be waiting for the other one to finish so that they come in. And then this other one would just whistle at me. And then one would speak in a kind of speaking-in-tongues kind of voice. And then The Eagles covered it.

— Neil Young, inducting Waits into the Rock and Roll Hall of Fame, 2011

Various artists have covered his songs. In 1973, Tim Buckley covered "Martha", just like Meat Loaf did in 1995. The Eagles covered "Ol' 55" and Dion covered "Heart of Saturday Night" and "San Diego Serenade". Rod Stewart had success with covers of "Downtown Train" and "Tom Traubert's Blues"; Bob Seger covered "Blind Love", "New Coat of Paint", “16 Shells From A Thirty-Ought Six,” and "Downtown Train". Paul Young covered "Soldier's Things" on The Secret of Association (1985) and the Ramones covered "I Don't Wanna Grow Up" on their final album, ¡Adios Amigos! (1995). Johnny Cash sang "Down There by the Train", which Waits wrote for him, on American Recordings (1994), calling Waits "a very special writer, my kind of writer." Tori Amos covered "Time" on Strange Little Girls (2001); she performed it on the Late Show With David Letterman, the first musical performance on the show after 9/11. Willie Nelson covered "Picture in a Frame" on It Always Will Be (2004). Holly Cole released an album of Waits covers, Temptation (1995), as did Scarlett Johansson with Anywhere I Lay My Head (2008). Neko Case performed "Christmas Card from a Hooker in Minneapolis" on the tribute album New Coat of Paint (2000). Norah Jones included a song Waits wrote for her, "Long Way Home", on her album Feels Like Home (2004). Joan Baez covered his songs on Day After Tomorrow (2008) and Whistle Down the Wind (2018). Rosanne Cash, Aimee Mann, Phoebe Bridgers and others contributed to Come On Up to the House: Women Sing Waits (2019).

He was included on Rolling Stone's lists of 100 Greatest Singers and 100 Greatest Songwriters. In 2006, Waits and Brennan were ranked fourth on Paste's list of the hundred greatest living songwriters. In 2016, Waits and Brennan, along with John Prine, were honored with The Song Lyrics of Literary Excellence Award from PEN New England. Colum McCann presented the honor to Waits and Brennan, saying "They find out what others have not quite fathomed yet. They catch the ordinary so that it can be sung extraordinarily in the future."

Waits has influenced artists in other fields. Kazuo Ishiguro recalls how Waits influenced his novel The Remains of the Day:

I thought I'd finished Remains, but then one evening heard Tom Waits singing his song "Ruby's Arms". It's a ballad about a soldier leaving his lover sleeping in the early hours to go away on a train. Nothing unusual in that. But the song is sung in the voice of a rough American hobo type utterly unaccustomed to wearing his emotions on his sleeve... there comes a moment, when the singer declares his heart is breaking, that's almost unbearably moving because of the tension between the sentiment itself and the huge resistance that's obviously been overcome to utter it. Waits sings the line with cathartic magnificence, and you feel a lifetime of tough-guy stoicism crumbling in the face of overwhelming sadness. I heard this and reversed a decision I'd made, that Stevens would remain emotionally buttoned up right to the bitter end. I decided that at just one point–which I'd have to choose very carefully–his rigid defence would crack, and a hitherto concealed tragic romanticism would be glimpsed.

Ishiguro thanked Waits in his Nobel lecture.

Another author who notes Waits's influence is Ian Rankin:

I already knew Tom Waits's music, those soulful communications from the louche underbelly of the American dream, but nothing had prepared me for Swordfishtrombones. I first heard it on a friend's stereo system, the pair of us transfixed by what was happening in front of our ears. It felt to me as if a vaudeville show was taking place in a scrapyard, the music whirling and clanging, Waits presiding over it all like a bruised but keen-eyed master of ceremonies. Rain Dogs added extra textures and refinements, laying its (marked) cards on the table with its opening track, "Singapore", a novel contained within two and a half minutes of controlled musical mayhem. By the time of its release I had left university and was trying to shape myself into a writer. I admired Waits's lyrical vision and concision–the man was a born storyteller, stopping travellers who had wandered into the wrong part of town and compelling them with his words.

His songs have been used in film, television and theater. When the actor Robert Carlyle formed a theatre, he named it the Rain Dog Theatre after Waits's album. Cabaret shows have been set to his songs, among them Robert Berdahl's Warm Beer, Cold Women and Stewart D'Arrietta's Belly of a Drunken Piano. In addition to scoring films for Bell, Coppola, and Jarmusch, Waits has written songs for soundtracks: "Never Let Go" for American Heart; "Walk Away" and "The Fall of Troy" for Dead Man Walking and "Little Drop of Poison" for The End of Violence, which later appeared in Shrek 2. "Temptation" and "Cold Cold Ground" appear in Léolo; "Innocent When You Dream" in Smoke; "Goin' Out West" in Fight Club; "Underground" in Robots; "All The World is Green" and "Green Grass" in The Diving Bell and the Butterfly. Enron: The Smartest Guys in the Room features "What's He Building?", "Straight to the Top (Vegas)", "Temptation" and "God's Away on Business". "Come On Up To The House" is in the end credits of Wake Up Dead Man (2025). The titles of the films Romeo Is Bleeding and Blue Valentine are derived from Waits songs. "Hold On" and "I Don't Wanna Grow Up" were sung by Beth Greene (Emily Kinney) in The Walking Dead episodes "I Ain't a Judas" and "Infected", respectively. The Wire used "Way Down in the Hole" as its opening theme; each season featured a different rendition, including the Blind Boys of Alabama, Waits, the Neville Brothers, DoMaJe, and Steve Earle. The season four rendition was arranged and recorded for the show and is performed by five Baltimore teenagers: Ivan Ashford, Markel Steele, Cameron Brown, Tariq Al-Sabir and Avery Bargasse. In 2014, Aaron Posner and the magician Teller directed a production of Shakespeare's The Tempest featuring songs by Waits and Brennan.

In June 2026, CBS News included his song Make It Rain in its list of the 250 essential American songs of the past 250 years.

== Discography ==
- Closing Time (1973)
- The Heart of Saturday Night (1974)
- Nighthawks at the Diner (1975)
- Small Change (1976)
- Foreign Affairs (1977)
- Blue Valentine (1978)
- Heartattack and Vine (1980)
- Swordfishtrombones (1983)
- Rain Dogs (1985)
- Franks Wild Years (1987)
- Bone Machine (1992)
- The Black Rider (1993)
- Mule Variations (1999)
- Alice (2002)
- Blood Money (2002)
- Real Gone (2004)
- Bad as Me (2011)

== Tours ==
- Closing Time Tour (1973)
- The Heart of Saturday Night Tour (1974–1975)
- Small Change Tour (1975–1976)
- Foreign Affairs Tour (1977)
- Blue Valentine Tour (1978–1979)
- Heartattack and Vine Tour (1980–1982)
- Rain Dogs Tour (1985)
- Big Time Tour (1987)
- Get Behind the Mule Tour (1999)
- Real Gone Tour (2004)
- The Orphans Tour (2006)
- Glitter and Doom Tour (2008)

== Filmography ==
=== Film ===
†	Denotes films that have not yet been released

Year	Film	Role	Notes
1978	Paradise Alley	Mumbles	
1981	Wolfen	Drunken Bar Owner	Uncredited
1982	One from the Heart	Trumpet player	Also composer (uncredited as actor)
1983	The Outsiders	Buck Merrill	
1983	Rumble Fish	Benny	
1984	The Stone Boy	Petrified man at carnival	Uncredited
1984	The Cotton Club	Irving Stark	
1986	Down by Law	Zach	
1987	Ironweed	Rudy	
1988	Greasy Lake	Narrator	Video
1988	Candy Mountain	Al Silk	
1988	Big Time	Himself	Documentary, also co-writer
1989	Bearskin: An Urban Fairytale	Silva	
1989	Cold Feet	Kenny	
1989	Mystery Train	Radio D.J. (voice)	
1990	The Two Jakes	Plainclothes Policeman	Uncredited
1991	At Play in the Fields of the Lord	Wolf	
1991	The Fisher King	Disabled Veteran	Uncredited
1991	Queens Logic	Monte	
1991	Night on Earth	—N/a	Composer
1992	Bram Stoker's Dracula	R. M. Renfield	
1993	Short Cuts	Earl Piggot	
1999	Mystery Men	Doc Heller	
2001	The Last Castle	—N/a	Composer with Jerry Goldsmith
2003	Coffee and Cigarettes	Himself	Segment: "Somewhere in California"
2003	Bukowski: Born Into This	Himself	Documentary about Charles Bukowski
2005	Domino	Wanderer	
2005	The Tiger and the Snow	Himself	
2006	Wristcutters: A Love Story	Kneller	
2006	Absolute Wilson	Himself	Documentary about Robert Wilson
2009	The Imaginarium of Doctor Parnassus	Mr. Nick	
2009	One Fast Move or I'm Gone: Kerouac's Big Sur	Himself	Documentary about Jack Kerouac
2010	The Book of Eli	Engineer	
2011	The Monster of Nix	Virgil (voice)	Short film
2011	Twixt	Narrator	
2012	Seven Psychopaths	Zachariah	
2018	The Ballad of Buster Scruggs	Prospector	Segment: "All Gold Canyon"
2018	The Old Man & the Gun	Waller	
2019	The Dead Don't Die	Hermit Bob	
2021	Licorice Pizza	Rex Blau	
2025	Father Mother Sister Brother	Father	Segment: "Father"
2026	Wild Horse Nine	Jim	
2026	Ray Gunn	Eye-ra Kadok (voice)	
2026	Wildwood	Maxim (voice)	
TBA	Lincoln in the Bardo †	Jasper Randall / Demon (voice)	In production

=== Television ===
†	Denotes films that have not yet been released

Year	Film	Role	Notes
1991	Fishing with John	Himself	Episode: "Tom Waits"
1992	Egos & Icons	Himself	Episode: "Skid Romeo"
1999	VH1 Storytellers	Himself	Season 4, episode 3
2000	Tom Waits In Warsaw	Himself	Polish network, TV4 special
2001	Freedom Highway: Songs That Shaped a Century	Himself	Irish TV documentary
2013	The Simpsons	Lloyd (voice)	Episode: "Homer Goes to Prep School"
2021	Ultra City Smiths	The Narrator (voice)	6 episodes
2021	Robert Wilson - The Beauty of the Mysterious	Himself	German network, Arte documentary about Robert Wilson
2025	Il Fattore Umano	Himself	Italian TV docuseries (Rai 3); episode: "Ultima Fermata"
