= The Heart of Saturday Night =

Studio album by Tom Waits
- Released: October 15, 1974
- Studio: Wally Heider's Studio 3 (Hollywood)
- Genre: Folk; blues; jazz
- Length: 41:28
- Label: Asylum
- Producer: Bones Howe

Tom Waits chronology
Closing Time (1973)	The Heart of Saturday Night (1974)	Nighthawks at the Diner (1975)

Singles from The Heart of Saturday Night
- 1. "Blue Skies (non-album single)" Released: October 1974; 2. "San Diego Serenade" Released: 1975

The Heart of Saturday Night is the second studio album by singer and songwriter Tom Waits, released on October 15, 1974, on Asylum Records. The title song was written as a tribute to Jack Kerouac. The album marks the start of a decade-long collaboration between Waits and Bones Howe, who produced and engineered all Waits' recordings until the artist left Asylum.

== Cover ==
The album cover is based on In the Wee Small Hours by Frank Sinatra. It is an illustration featuring a tired Tom Waits being observed by a blonde woman as he exits a neon-lit cocktail lounge late at night. Cal Schenkel was the art director and the cover art was created by Lynn Lascaro.

== Critical reception ==
Professional ratings
Review scores
Source	Rating
AllMusic	3.5/5 stars
Christgau's Record Guide	C+
Classic Rock	7/10
Mojo	4/5 stars
Overdose	B
Pitchfork	7.9/10
Q	4/5 stars
The Rolling Stone Album Guide	4/5 stars
Uncut	4/5 stars
The Village Voice	B−

In a contemporary review for The Village Voice, Janet Maslin regarded the songs as tawdry affectations of "a boozy vertigo" marred by Waits' vague lyrics and ill-advised puns on an album that is "too self-consciously limited" in mood. "It demands to be listened to after hours", Maslin wrote, "when that cloud of self-pitying gloom has descended and the vino is close at hand". Fellow Village Voice critic Robert Christgau was also critical of Waits' compositions, writing that "there might be as many coverable songs here as there were on his first album if mournful melodies didn't merge into neo imagery in the spindrift dirge of the honky-tonk beatnik night. Dig?"

In a retrospective review for the Los Angeles Times, Buddy Seigal was more impressed by Waits' "touchingly, unashamedly sentimental" songs, calling The Heart of Saturday Night perhaps the singer's most "mature, ingenuous and fully realized" album. It was ranked number 339 on Rolling Stone magazine's list of the 500 greatest albums of all time.

== Track listing ==
All songs written and composed by Tom Waits.

Side one
No.	Title	Length
1.	"New Coat of Paint"	3:23
2.	"San Diego Serenade"	3:30
3.	"Semi Suite"	3:29
4.	"Shiver Me Timbers"	4:26
5.	"Diamonds on My Windshield"	3:12
6.	"(Looking for) The Heart of Saturday Night"	3:53

Side two
No.	Title	Length
1.	"Fumblin' with the Blues"	3:02
2.	"Please Call Me, Baby"	4:25
3.	"Depot, Depot"	3:46
4.	"Drunk on the Moon"	5:06
5.	"The Ghosts of Saturday Night (After Hours at Napoleone's Pizza House)"	3:16
Total length:		41:28

== Personnel ==
All personnel credits are as listed in the album's liner notes.

Performer

- Tom Waits – vocals, piano, guitar on "(Looking for) The Heart of Saturday Night"

Musicians

- Arthur Richards – guitar
- Jim Hughart – double bass
- Oscar Brashear – trumpet
- Tom Scott – tenor saxophone, clarinet on "Fumblin' With the Blues"
- Jim Gordon – drums, knee slaps and foot taps on "(Looking for) The Heart of Saturday Night"
- Bob Alcivar – arranger
- Mike Melvoin – "head" arrangements and complementary orchestral arrangements and direction, piano on "New Coat of Paint" and "Fumblin' With the Blues"

Technical personnel

- Bones Howe – producer, engineer, percussion on "San Diego Serenade"
- Geoff Howe – engineer
- Pamela Vale – production coordinator
- Terry Dunavan – mastering

Design personnel

- Cal Schenkel – art direction
- Lynn Lascaro – illustrations
- Scott Smith – photography

== Certifications ==
Region	Certification	Certified units/sales
United Kingdom (BPI)	Gold	100,000^{^}
^{^} Shipments figures based on certification alone.

== Bibliography ==
- Jacobs, Jay (2010). Wild Years: The Music and Myth of Tom Waits (illustrated, revised ed.). ECW Press. ISBN 9781554902613.
