= Nighthawks at the Diner =

Studio album by Tom Waits
- Released: October 21, 1975
- Recorded: July 30–31, 1975
- Venues: Record Plant Studios, Los Angeles
- Genres: Spoken word; jazz
- Length: 73:54
- Label: Asylum
- Producer: Bones Howe

Tom Waits chronology
| The Heart of Saturday Night (1974) | Nighthawks at the Diner (1975) | Small Change (1976) |

Nighthawks at the Diner is the third studio album by singer and songwriter Tom Waits, released on October 21, 1975, on Asylum Records. It was recorded over four sessions in July in the Los Angeles Record Plant studio in front of a small invited audience set up to recreate the atmosphere of a jazz club. The album peaked at 164 on the Billboard 200, the highest place Waits had held at the time, and was certified silver by the BPI in 2010. It has received critical acclaim for its successful mood-setting, capturing of the jazz-club atmosphere and characterization.

== Background ==
The title was inspired by Edward Hopper's 1942 painting Nighthawks. The album's working title had been "Nighthawk Postcards from Easy Street," but was shortened to Nighthawks at the Diner, which is the opening line to "Eggs and Sausage (In a Cadillac with Susan Michelson)". The cover, designed by Cal Schenkel, evokes the mood of the painting.

== Recording ==
The album was recorded at Record Plant Los Angeles on July 30 and 31, 1975. (Note: The album's liner notes also credit Wally Heider Recording, Hollywood.) Waits opens the album by calling the venue Raphael's Silver Cloud Lounge. Bones Howe recalled:

"We did it as a live recording, which was unusual for an artist so new [...] Herb Cohen and I both had a sense that we needed to bring out the jazz in Waits more clearly. Tom was a great performer on stage [...] So we started talking about where we could do an album that would have a live feel to it. We thought about clubs, but the well-known ones like The Troubadour were toilets in those days. Then I remembered that Barbra Streisand had made a record at the old Record Plant Studios, when they were on 3rd Street near Cahuenga Boulevard [...] There was a room there that she got an entire orchestra into. Back in those days they would just roll the consoles around to where they needed them. So Herb and I said let's see if we can put tables and chairs in there and get an audience in and record a show."

Howe was mostly responsible for organizing the band for the "live show", and creating the right atmosphere for the record.

"I got Michael Melvoin on piano, and he was one of the greatest jazz arrangers ever; I had Jim Hughart on bass, Bill Goodwin on drums and Pete Christlieb on sax. It was a totally jazz rhythm section. Herb gave out tickets to all his friends, we set up a bar, put potato chips on the tables and we had a sell-out, two nights, two shows a night, July 30 and 31, 1975. I remember that the opening act was a stripper. Her name was Dewana and her husband was a taxi driver. So for her the band played bump-and-grind music – and there's no jazz player who has never played a strip joint, so they knew exactly what to do. But it put the room in exactly the right mood. Then Waits came out and sang 'Emotional Weather Report.' Then he turned around to face the band and read the classified section of the paper while they played. It was like Allen Ginsberg with a really, really good band."

Dewana was an old-time burlesque queen whom Tom had met on one of his jaunts to the Hollywood underworld. Jim Hughart, who played upright bass on the recordings, recalled the experience of preparing for and recording the album:

"Preparing for this thing, we had to memorize all this stuff, 'cause Waits had nothing on paper. So ultimately, we spent four or five days in a rehearsal studio going over this stuff. And that was drudgery. But when we did actually get it all prepared and go and record, that was the fastest two days of recording I've ever spent in my life. It was so fun. Some of the tunes were not what you'd call jazz tunes, but for the most part that was like a jazz record. This was a jazz band. Bill Goodwin was a drummer who was associated with Phil Woods for years. Pete Christlieb is one of the best jazz tenor players who ever lived. And my old friend, Mike Melvoin, played piano. There's a good reason why it was accepted as a jazz record."

During the track "Nighthawk Postcards (From Easy Street)", Waits ad-libs lines from "That's Life", a hit for Frank Sinatra.

== Reception ==
Professional ratings
Review scores
| Source | Rating |
|---|---|
| AllMusic | 3.5/5 stars |
| Christgau's Record Guide | B |
| Classic Rock | 8/10 |
| Mojo | 4/5 stars |
| Pitchfork | 8.5/10 |
| The Rolling Stone Album Guide | 4/5 stars |
| Uncut | 4/5 stars |

Nighthawks at the Diner charted on the Billboard 200, where it peaked at 164. This was the highest position he had ever held at the time. His next album, Small Change, would be his highest charting with Asylum Records, with whom he would part company in 1981. Nighthawks is currently certified Silver by the BPI.

The album has been generally well received by critics, and is considered by some to be the best album of his early career. It is included in the book 1001 Albums You Must Hear Before You Die. In its accompanying chapter in the book, Peter Watts stated that "although it could be dismissed as an entertaining conceit, the fake nightclub atmosphere of Nighthawks... possibly captures the appeal of early Waits even better than the two impressive albums that preceded it." AllMusic reviewer Mark Deming wrote: "You could call it overdone, but then, this kind of material made its impact through an accumulation of miscellaneous detail, and who's to say how much is too much?". He positively noted Waits' addition of comedy and acting into the set. On November 18, 2010, Rhapsody named it the album of the day, with staff writer Nate Cavalieri noting that "Waits' meticulous persona is remarkable."

== Track listing ==
All tracks are written by Tom Waits, except where noted.

Side one
| No. | Title | Length |
|---|---|---|
| 1. | "(Opening Intro)" | 2:58 |
| 2. | "Emotional Weather Report" | 3:47 |
| 3. | "(Intro)" | 2:16 |
| 4. | "On a Foggy Night" | 3:48 |
| 5. | "(Intro)" | 1:53 |
| 6. | "Eggs and Sausage (In a Cadillac with Susan Michelson)" | 4:19 |

Side two
| No. | Title | Length |
|---|---|---|
| 1. | "(Intro)" | 3:02 |
| 2. | "Better Off Without a Wife" | 3:59 |
| 3. | "Nighthawk Postcards (From Easy Street)" | 11:30 |

Side three
| No. | Title | Writer(s) | Length |
|---|---|---|---|
| 1. | "(Intro)" | | 0:55 |
| 2. | "Warm Beer and Cold Women" | | 5:21 |
| 3. | "(Intro)" | | 0:47 |
| 4. | "Putnam County" | | 7:35 |
| 5. | "Spare Parts I (A Nocturnal Emission)" | Waits, Chuck E. Weiss | 6:25 |

Side four
| No. | Title | Writer(s) | Length |
|---|---|---|---|
| 1. | "Nobody" | | 2:51 |
| 2. | "(Intro)" | | 0:40 |
| 3. | "Big Joe and Phantom 309" | Tommy Faile | 6:29 |
| 4. | "Spare Parts II and Closing" | | 5:13 |

== Personnel ==
- Tom Waits – vocals, piano, guitar
- Pete Christlieb – tenor saxophone
- Bill Goodwin – drums
- Jim Hughart – upright bass
- Mike Melvoin – piano, electric piano

== Charts ==
| Chart (1975) | Peak position |
|---|---|
| US Billboard 200 | 164 |

== Certifications ==
| Region | Certification | Certified units/sales |
|---|---|---|
| United Kingdom (BPI) | Silver | 60,000^{^} |
^{^} Shipments figures based on certification alone.
