= Tom Waits discography =

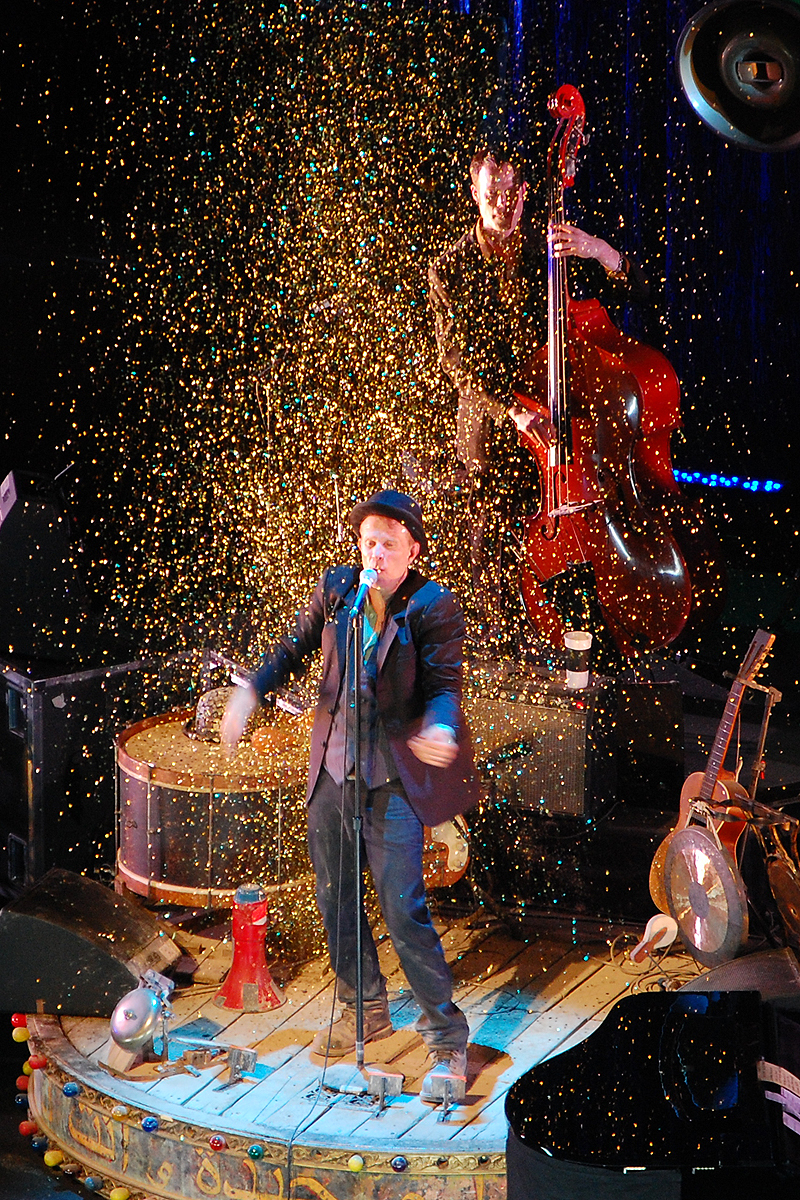
- Waits performing in 2008
- Studio albums: 17
- Soundtrack albums: 2
- Live albums: 2
- Compilation albums: 7
- Singles: 23
- Video albums: 1
- Music videos: 16
- Box sets: 1

The discography of the American rock musician Tom Waits spans five decades. It consists of 17 studio albums, 3 live albums, 7 compilation albums, 23 singles, 2 soundtracks, and 1 box set. Waits has also released one video album and 16 music videos.

Waits's debut release was the 1973 single "Ol' '55", which was the lead single for his debut album Closing Time (1973). He began recording in 1971, but these first sessions would not be released until the beginning of the 1990s. For most of the 1970s he recorded for Asylum Records. After cutting his first soundtrack album for the Francis Ford Coppola musical film One from the Heart, Waits signed with Island Records for the 1980s.

The release of Bone Machine in 1992 brought him a Grammy Award, after a less prolific decade. After Island Records, Waits moved to Anti/Epitaph for Mule Variations, an album that won him a second Grammy. Since the mid-1980s, he has collaborated with his wife Kathleen Brennan. His latest studio album, titled Bad as Me, was released in 2011.

As of 2011, according to Nielsen Soundscan, Waits has sold 4.6 million albums in the United States.

== Albums ==
=== Studio albums ===
Year	Album details	Peak chart positions										Sales	Certifications (sales thresholds)
Year	Album details	US	AUS	AUT	FRA	GER	IRL	NLD	NOR	SWE	UK	Sales	Certifications (sales thresholds)
1973	Closing Time: Released: March 6, 1973; Label: Asylum (53 030); Formats: LP, CD	—	—	—	—	44	29	—	—	—	—		BPI: Gold
1974	The Heart of Saturday Night: Released: October 15, 1974; Label: Asylum (53 035); Formats: LP, CD	201	—	—	—	—	—	—	—	—	—		BPI: Gold
1975	Nighthawks at the Diner: Released: October 21, 1975; Label: Asylum (63002); Formats: 2×LP, CS, CD	164	—	—	—	—	—	—	—	—	—		BPI: Silver
1976	Small Change: Released: September 21, 1976; Label: Asylum (53 050); Formats: LP, CD	89	—	—	—	—	—	—	—	—	—		ARIA: Gold; BPI: Silver
1977	Foreign Affairs: Released: September 13, 1977; Label: Asylum (53 068); Formats: LP, CS, CD	113	—	—	—	—	—	—	—	—	—		
1978	Blue Valentine: Released: September 5, 1978; Label: Asylum (53 088); Formats: LP, CS, CD	181	42	—	—	—	—	—	—	—	—		BPI: Gold
1980	Heartattack and Vine: Released: September 9, 1980; Label: Asylum (52 252); Formats: LP, CS, CD	96	31	—	—	—	81	—	—	—	—		
1983	Swordfishtrombones: Released: September 1, 1983; Label: Island (90095); Formats: LP, CS, CD	167	—	—	—	—	—	48	18	—	62		BPI: Silver
1985	Rain Dogs: Released: September 30, 1985; Label: Island (90299); Formats: LP, CS, CD	181	49	26	—	—	—	23	12	5	29		RIAA: Gold; BPI: Gold; MC: Gold
1987	Franks Wild Years: Released: August 17, 1987; Label: Island (90572); Formats: LP, CS, CD	115	83	24	—	49	—	21	13	17	20		MC: Gold
1992	Bone Machine: Released: September 8, 1992; Label: Island (512 580); Formats: CD, LP, CS	176	41	22	—	42	—	31	15	38	26		
1993	The Black Rider: Released: November 2, 1993; Label: Island (518 559); Formats: CD, LP	130	165	—	—	—	—	68	—	—	47		
1999	Mule Variations: Released: April 16, 1999; Label: Anti- (86547); Formats: CD, 2×LP, CS, MD	30	13	7	22	4	—	12	1	7	9	US: 440,000; Europe: 500,000; WW: 1,000,000	RIAA: Gold; BPI: Silver; MC: Gold; NVPI: Platinum
2002	Alice: Released: May 4, 2002; Label: Anti- (86632); Formats: CD, LP	33	26	3	27	10	5	16	3	13	20	US: 140,000; Europe: 250,000	NVPI: Gold
2002	Blood Money: Released: May 4, 2002; Label: Anti- (86629); Formats: CD, LP	32	25	5	36	9	4	21	4	12	21	US: 143,000	NVPI: Gold
2004	Real Gone: Released: October 3, 2004; Label: Anti- (86678); Formats: CD, 2×LP	28	27	11	39	19	9	10	2	9	16	US: 202,000; Europe: 250,000	BPI: Silver
2011	Bad as Me: Released: October 21, 2011; Label: Anti- (87151); Formats: CD, LP, 2×CD, digital download	6	11	5	28	7	5	3	1	4	10	US: 190,000; UK: 40,305; Europe: 200,000	

==== Soundtrack albums ====
Year	Album details
1982	One from the Heart (with Crystal Gayle): Released: February 1982; Label: CBS (37703); Formats: LP, CD
1992	Night on Earth: Released: April 7, 1992; Label: Island (510 725); Formats: CD, LP

=== Live albums ===
Year	Album details	Peak chart positions									
Year	Album details	US	AUS	AUT	FRA	GER	IRL	NLD	NOR	SWE	UK
1988	Big Time: Released: September 1988; Label: Island (90987); Format: LP, CD, CS	152	110	—	—	—	—	—	—	36	84
2009	Glitter and Doom Live: Released: November 23, 2009; Label: Anti- (87053); Format: 2×CD, 2×LP, digital download	63	113	30	91	61	44	36	5	46	76

=== Compilation albums ===
Year	Album details	Peak chart positions				
Year	Album details	AUS	AUT	NOR	NZL	UK
1981	Bounced Checks: Released: 1981; Label: Asylum (52 316); Formats: LP, CS	75	—	—	24	—
1984	Anthology of Tom Waits: Released: 1984; Label: Asylum (60 416); Formats: LP, CS	—	—	—	—	—
1986	Asylum Years: Released: 1986; Label: Asylum (960 321); Formats: LP, CD	167	—	40	—	—
1991	The Early Years, Volume One: Released: July 16, 1991; Label: Bizarre/Manifesto Records (40601); Formats: CD, LP	—	—	—	—	—
1993	The Early Years, Volume Two: Released: February 1993; Label: Bizarre/Manifesto Records (40602); Formats: CD, LP	—	—	—	—	—
1998	Beautiful Maladies – The Island Years: Released: June 1998; Label: Island (524 519); Formats: CD	129	—	18	—	63
2001	Used Songs 1973–1980: Released: October 16, 2001; Label: Rhino (78351); Formats: CD	—	63	18	—	—

=== Box sets ===
Year	Album details	Peak chart positions										Sales	Certifications (sales thresholds)
Year	Album details	US	AUS	AUT	FRA	GER	IRL	NLD	NOR	SWE	UK	Sales	Certifications (sales thresholds)
2006	Orphans: Brawlers, Bawlers & Bastards: Released: November 20, 2006; Label: Anti- (86844); Formats: 3×CD, 7×LP, digital download	74	59	15	46	26	25	5	4	6	49	Europe: 250,000	RIAA: Gold; MC: Gold; NVPI: Gold

== Singles ==
=== Retail singles ===
Year	Single	Peak chart positions				Album
Year	Single	AUS	BEL	FRA	UK	Album
1973	"Ol' '55"	—	—	—	—	Closing Time
1974	"Blue Skies"	—	—	—	—	non-album single
1975	"San Diego Serenade"	—	—	—	—	The Heart of Saturday Night
1976	"Step Right Up"	—	—	—	—	Small Change
1979	"Somewhere"	—	—	—	—	Blue Valentine
1980	"Jersey Girl"	—	—	—	—	Heartattack and Vine
1985	"Downtown Train"	—	—	—	—	Rain Dogs
1986	"In the Neighborhood"	—	—	—	80	Swordfishtrombones
1987	"Hang On St. Christopher"	—	—	—	—	Franks Wild Years
1988	"16 Shells From a Thirty-Ought-Six" (live)	—	—	—	—	Big Time
1992	"Goin' Out West"	167	—	—	—	Bone Machine
1999	"Hold On"	—	—	—	—	Mule Variations
2006	"Lie to Me"	—	—	—	—	Orphans: Brawlers, Bawlers & Bastards
2011	"Bad as Me"	—	—	50	—	Bad as Me
2011	"Back in the Crowd"	—	123	—	—	Bad as Me

=== Promotional singles ===
Year	Single	Album
1975	"(Looking for) The Heart of Saturday Night"	The Heart of Saturday Night
1985	"Tango Till They're Sore"	Down By Law
1993	"Heartattack and Vine"	Heartattack and Vine
1993	"I'll Shoot the Moon"	The Black Rider
2002	"Alice"	Alice
2002	"God's Away on Business"	Blood Money
2004	"How It's Gonna End"	Real Gone
2004	"Make It Rain"	Real Gone

== Other appearances ==
=== Studio ===
Year	Song(s)	Album	Album type	Notes
1985	"What Keeps Mankind Alive?"	Lost in the Stars: The Music of Kurt Weill	tribute	Kurt Weill cover
1988	"Heigh Ho (The Dwarfs Marching Song)"	Stay Awake	tribute	cover of song from Snow White and the Seven Dwarfs
1989	"Sea of Love"	Sea of Love	soundtrack	Phil Phillips cover
1990	"It's All Right with Me"	Red Hot + Blue	charity	Cole Porter cover
1996	"Fall of Troy" and "Walk Away"	Dead Man Walking	soundtrack	original songs
1997	"Little Drop of Poison"	The End of Violence	soundtrack	original songs
1999	"Books of Moses"	More Oar: A Tribute to the Skip Spence Album	tribute	Skip Spence cover
1999	"On the Road"	Jack Kerouac Reads on the Road	anthology	Jack Kerouac adaptation, with Primus
2000	"Putting on the Dog" and "It's Over"	Liberty Heights	soundtrack	original songs
2000	"Rains on Me"	Free the West Memphis 3	charity	with Chuck E. Weiss
2001	"Long Way Home" and "Jayne's Blue Wish"	Big Bad Love	soundtrack	original song
2002	"Bend Down the Branches"	For the Kids	charity	original song, previously featured in 1998 film Bunny
2003	"The Return of Jackie and Judy"	We're a Happy Family: A Tribute to Ramones	tribute	Ramones cover
2004	"King Kong"	The Late Great Daniel Johnston: Discovered Covered	tribute	Daniel Johnston cover
2013	"Shenandoah"	Son of Rogues Gallery: Pirate Ballads, Sea Songs & Chanteys	various artists	with Keith Richards
2016	"The Soul of a Man" and "John the Revelator"	God Don't Never Change: The Songs of Blind Willie Johnson	tribute	Blind Willie Johnson covers

=== Live ===
Year	Song(s)	Album	Notes
1987	various tracks	Roy Orbison and Friends: A Black and White Night	
1998	"Fall of Troy"	Rare on Air, Volume Four	
2003	"Way Down In The Hole," "God's Away On Business," "Lost In The Harbor," and "Diamond In Your Mind"	Healing the Divide: A Concert for Peace and Reconciliation	with Kronos Quartet

=== Featured artist and guest spots ===
Year	Song(s)	Album	Artist
1975	"Your Sweet and Shiney Eyes"	Home Plate	Bonnie Raitt
1979	"Waitin for Waits"	Hollywood Madness	Richie Cole
1986	"Harlem Shuffle"	Dirty Work	The Rolling Stones
1989	"Silent Night"	SOS United	SOS Children's Villages
1989	"Date to Church"	I'll Be You single	The Replacements
1991	"Tommy the Cat"	Sailing the Seas of Cheese	Primus
1991	"Thousand Bing Bangs" and "The Movie"	Devout Catalyst	Ken Nordine
1991	"Little Man" and "I'm Not Your Fool Anymore"	Mississippi Lad	Teddy Edwards
1992	"Adios Lounge"	Beautiful Mess	Thelonious Monster
1993	"Tramp and Tom Waits With Full Orchestra" and "Coda: Tom Waits With High Strings"	Jesus Blood Never Failed Me Yet	Gavin Bryars
1998	"River of Men" and "World of Adventure"	Fishing With John	John Lurie
1999	"Coattails of a Dead Man"	Antipop	Primus
1999	"Do You Know What I Idi Amin?" and "It Rains on Me", and co-produced album	Extremely Cool	Chuck E. Weiss
2000	"Helium Reprise"	Helium	Tin Hat Trio
2000	"I'll Tell Why That Is"	Beatin' the Heat	Dan Hicks
2001	"Buzz Fledderjohn" and "Fannin'", and produced album	Wicked Grin	John P. Hammond
2001	"Dog Door"	It's a Wonderful Life	Sparklehorse
2001	"Mahfouz"	Witness	Dave Douglas
2002	"What's He Building in There""	Hullabaloo Soundtrack	Muse
2002	"Diamond in Your Mind"	Don't Give Up On Me	Solomon Burke
2003	"Go Tell It on the Mountain"	Go Tell It on the Mountain	The Blind Boys of Alabama
2004	"Kitate"	The Ride	Los Lobos
2005	"Going Fetal""	Blinking Lights and Other Revelations	Eels
2006	"Morning Hollow"	Dreamt for Light Years in the Belly of a Mountain	Sparklehorse
2007	"Pray"	Traineater	The Book of Knots
2008	"Waitress"	When Life Gives You Lemons, You Paint That Shit Gold	Atmosphere
2009	"Spacious Thoughts"	The Spirit of Apollo	N.A.S.A.
2010	"Tootie Ma Was a Big Fine Thing" and "Corrine Died on The Battlefield"	Preservation: An Album to Benefit Preservation Hall & The Preservation Hall Music Outreach Program	Preservation Hall Jazz Band
2011	"Ghost to a Ghost" and "Fadin' Moon"	Ghost to a Ghost/Gutter Town	Hank Williams III
2018	"Bella Ciao"	Songs Of Resistance 1942 - 2018	Marc Ribot
2026	"Boots on the Ground"		Massive Attack

=== Other ===
- 1987 Smack My Crack: "The Pontiac", spoken-word piece
- 1993 Born to Choose: "Filipino Box Spring Hog", earlier release of Mule Variations song
- 2007 People Take Warning! Murder Ballads and Disaster Songs 1913–1938, by various artists: Waits wrote the introduction for this 3 CD reissue anthology produced by Christopher King and Henry "Hank" Sapoznik
- 2011 Hard Ground by Michael O'Brien: contributed poems to accompany photographs of homeless people in Austin, Texas taken by Michael O'Brien

=== Music videos ===
Year	Title	Director
1979	"The One That Got Away"	John Lamb
1983	"In the Neighborhood"	Haskell Wexler
1985	"Downtown Train"	Jean-Baptiste Mondino
1987	"Blow Wind Blow"	Chris Blum
1987	"Temptation"	Betzy Bromberg
1990	"It's All Right with Me"	Jim Jarmusch
1992	"Goin' Out West"	Jesse Dylan
1992	"I Don't Wanna Grow Up"	Jim Jarmusch
1999	"Hold On"	Matt Mahurin
1999	"Come On Up to the House"	Anders Lövgren
1999	"What's He Building?"	
2002	"God's Away on Business"	Jesse Dylan
2004	"Top of the Hill"	Chris Blum
2006	"Lie to Me"	Danny Clinch
2011	"Satisfied"	Jesse Dylan
2012	"Hell Broke Luce"	Matt Mahurin

=== Video albums ===
Year	Album details
1988	Big Time: Released: September 1988; Label: Island; Format: VHS
