= Beautiful Maladies =

Compilation album by Tom Waits
- Released: 1998
- Genre: Rock
- Label: Island

Tom Waits chronology
The Black Rider (1993)	Beautiful Maladies (1998)	Mule Variations (1999)

Professional ratings
Review scores
Source	Rating
Allmusic	link
Pitchfork Media	(8.6/10) link

Beautiful Maladies: The Island Years is a Tom Waits compilation album, consisting of previously released songs from his years recording with Island Records, most notably from the albums Swordfishtrombones, Rain Dogs, Big Time and Franks Wild Years. The tracks were selected by Tom Waits. The album was released in 1998, but represents Waits's output from 1983 to 1993.

== Track listing ==
1. "Hang On St. Christopher" (originally on the album Franks Wild Years) - 2:44
2. "Temptation" (originally on the album Franks Wild Years) - 3:53
3. "Clap Hands" (originally on the album Rain Dogs) - 3:48
4. "The Black Rider" (originally on the album The Black Rider) - 3:23
5. "Underground" (originally on the album Swordfishtrombones) - 1:59
6. "Jockey Full of Bourbon" (originally on the album Rain Dogs) - 2:47
7. "Earth Died Screaming" (originally on the album Bone Machine) - 3:38
8. "Innocent When You Dream (78)" (originally on the album Franks Wild Years) - 3:09
9. "Straight to the Top" (originally on the album Franks Wild Years) - 2:28
10. "Frank's Wild Years" (originally on the album Swordfishtrombones) - 1:52
11. "Singapore" (originally on the album Rain Dogs) - 2:45
12. "Shore Leave" (originally on the album Swordfishtrombones) - 4:18
13. "Johnsburg, Illinois" (originally on the album Swordfishtrombones) - 1:34
14. "Way Down in the Hole" (originally on the album Franks Wild Years) - 3:30
15. "Strange Weather" (Live) (originally on the album Big Time) - 3:34
16. "Cold, Cold Ground" (Live) (originally on the album Big Time) - 3:27
17. "November" (originally on the album The Black Rider) - 2:55
18. "Downtown Train" (originally on the album Rain Dogs) - 3:51
19. "16 Shells from a Thirty-Ought Six" (originally on the album Swordfishtrombones) - 4:33
20. "Jesus Gonna Be Here" (originally on the album Bone Machine) - 3:19
21. "Good Old World (Waltz)" (originally on the album Night on Earth) - 3:55
22. "I Don't Wanna Grow Up" (originally on the album Bone Machine) - 2:32
23. "Time" (originally on the album Rain Dogs) - 3:53
