= Orphans: Brawlers, Bawlers & Bastards =

Box set by Tom Waits
- Released: November 17, 2006
- Recorded: 1984–2005
- Genre: Rock
- Length: 189:17
- Label: ANTI-
- Producers: Kathleen Brennan, Tom Waits

Tom Waits chronology
Real Gone (2004)	Orphans: Brawlers, Bawlers & Bastards (2006)	Glitter and Doom Live (2009)

Singles from Orphans: Brawlers, Bawlers & Bastards
- 1. "Lie to Me" Released: October 2006

Orphans: Brawlers, Bawlers & Bastards is a limited edition three CD set by Tom Waits, released by the ANTI- label on November 17, 2006, in Europe and on November 21, 2006, in the United States.

Per Waits, the album consists of

A lot of songs that fell behind the stove while making dinner, about 60 tunes that we collected. Some are from films, some from compilations. Some is stuff that didn't fit on a record, things I recorded in the garage with kids. Oddball things, orphaned tunes.

It is divided into three discs, each a separate collection in its own right. The first, Brawlers, is blues and rock-based; the second, Bawlers, is centered on melancholic ballads; the third, Bastards, features spoken word pieces and other experimental works. The album includes influences of other genres, among them folk, gospel, jazz and Americana.

Orphans: Brawlers, Bawlers and Bastards received universal acclaim from critics, who lauded its experimentation and composition, and Waits's vocals. It was the second highest-scoring albums of the year on Metacritic, and was nominated for a Grammy Award for Best Contemporary Folk Album. It was also a fair commercial success, charting in the United States Billboard 200, as well as in Australia, Switzerland and Austria, reaching the top twenty in the latter. The roots of the songs are diverse; some are Waits's covers of songs by other artists, such as Phil Phillips's "Sea of Love" and the Ramones's "The Return of Jackie and Judy"; some were written by Waits for other artists; "Down There by the Train" and "Long Way Home" were written for Johnny Cash and Norah Jones, respectively.

The Orphans Tour was conducted in support of the album prior to its release.

== Background ==
The set is a collection of 26 rare and 30 brand new songs (there are two hidden tracks on disc 3). Each disc is intended as a separate collection in itself; the first with roughcut rock and blues, the second melancholy tunes and ballads, and the third the more experimental songs and spoken word pieces. The liner notes claim there are "56 songs, of which 30 are new".

== Subdivision into three albums ==
Of the decision to organize the songs into three themed sections (Brawlers, Bawlers and Bastards) Waits explained:

It was just a big pile of songs. It's like having a whole lot of footage for a film. It needs to be arranged in a meaningful way so it will be a balanced listening experience. You have this big box with all these things in it and it doesn't really have any meaning until it's sequenced. It took some doing. There's a thematic divide, and also pacing and all that. There are different sources to all these songs and they were written at different times. Making them work together is the trick.

Brawlers, the most rock and blues -oriented section, contains songs with themes ranging from failed relationships ("Lie to Me"), floods and subsequent havoc ("2:19"), to a song about the Israeli–Palestinian conflict ("Road to Peace"). It is musically eclectic, including such styles as gospel ("Ain't Goin' Down to the Well", "Lord I've Been Changed"), sentimental tunes ("Sea of Love"), and grim story-songs ("Lucinda").

Bawlers is composed of mostly downbeat numbers, replacing the hope of ballads on previous albums with resignation (notably "Bend Down the Branches", "Little Drop of Poison", "Fannin Street", "Little Man", and "Widow's Grove"). "Down There by the Train" was written by Waits for Johnny Cash, who sang it on his first American Recordings album. "Long Way Home" was written by Waits for Norah Jones, who sang it on her album Feels Like Home. Waits claims his original title for Bawlers was Shut Up and Eat Your Ballads.

Bastards is concerned with Waits's more experimental styles. It opens with an adaptation of Bertolt Brecht and Kurt Weill's "What Keeps Mankind Alive?" from The Threepenny Opera. It continues with "Children's Story", from Robert Wilson's production of Georg Büchner's Woyzeck, which Waits scored and later released as his Blood Money album. It also includes Waits's rendition of "Heigh-Ho", originally recorded for Stay Awake: Various Interpretations of Music from Vintage Disney Films. It contains other literary adaptations, including a Charles Bukowski poem about enlightenment ("Nirvana") and two songs, "Home I'll Never Be" and "On the Road", originally penned by Jack Kerouac.

== Reception ==
=== Critical ===
Professional ratings
Aggregate scores
Source	Rating
Metacritic	92/100
Review scores
Source	Rating
AllMusic	4.5/5 stars
The A.V. Club	A−
Entertainment Weekly	A
The Guardian	4/5 stars
Los Angeles Times	4/4 stars
MSN Music (Consumer Guide)	A
NME	8/10
Pitchfork	8.4/10
Rolling Stone	4/5 stars
Spin	4/5 stars

The album was released to highly positive reviews, scoring 92 out of 100 on aggregator Metacritic, indicating "universal acclaim". It ranked second on Metacritic's Top 30 albums of 2006, just behind Savane by Ali Farka Toure, and was nominated for the 2006 Shortlist Music Prize and the 2007 Grammy Award for Best Contemporary Folk Album.

Jimmy Newlin of Slant Magazine awarded it five out of five stars, writing that "Orphans isn't as cohesive a release as Waits's albums usually are"; he went on to note that "even Waits's missteps still manage to point in the right direction". Chris Power of BBC gave the album a four-and-a-half out of five points, writing that "Tom Waits can lay claim to one of the most fecund artistic imaginations in America", calling the album "Essential listening". Sylvie Simmons of The Guardian wrote that the album's three separate discs "make up one very powerful entry", and called the record "Great", giving it a four out of a possible five points. Teresa Nieman of Prefix Magazine praised it, comparing it to "taking a journey through a familiar yet entirely foreign dream-place", and "an experience of the most memorable kind". In a Punknews.org review, the album was said to be a "brilliant collection" of songs; "sonically cohesive and could pass as one very long recording session, laced over with the light coat of fuzz."

Jeff Vabrel of PopMatters gave it a nine out of ten stars; he affirmed that it was "One of his most skilful-ever blends of beauty and horror", also claiming that Waits's "world [...] is considerably more inviting and rewarding". Audra Schroeder of the Austin Chronicle gave the album a three out of five points, calling it a "seamless lot" which turns out to be a "bona fide gem of a collection". Stylus gave the album a B+, writing that the "tripartite typology works like a Waitsian Rorschach test: blurred, suggestive, and revealing", and while saying that the album may not have "something for everyone [...] what's missing says more about the listener than the record". Keith Phipps of The A.V. Club gave the album an A−, writing that "for a collection of leftovers gathered from hither and yon, they hang remarkably well together. What's more, many of them rank among Waits's best output. Waits may call them orphans, but another artist would call this a career." Robert Christgau gave the album an A.

=== Commercial ===
The album was certified Gold by the RIAA for shipping over 500,000 copies in the United States and sold over one million copies worldwide making it his best-selling album to date. It was awarded a diamond certification from the Independent Music Companies Association which indicated sales of at least 250,000 copies throughout Europe.

== Alternate editions ==
Some copies of the initial "limited edition" are autographed by Waits.

A limited number of other copies came with a special vinyl single, including the songs "Lie to Me" and "Crazy 'Bout My Baby".

A 7-disc vinyl box set of the album was released on December 8, 2009. This set contains an EP called Bonus, which contains six additional tracks not found on the CD version.

== Track listing ==
=== CD ===
All songs by Tom Waits and Kathleen Brennan, except where otherwise noted.

==== Disc one: Brawlers ====
1. "Lie to Me" – 2:10
2. "LowDown" – 4:15
3. "2:19" – 5:02
  - Appears on the Waits-produced John P. Hammond album Wicked Grin (2001)
4. "Fish in the Jailhouse" – 4:22
5. "Bottom of the World" – 5:42
  - Appears in the documentary Long Gone (2003)
6. "Lucinda" – 4:52
7. "Ain't Goin' Down to the Well" (Lead Belly, John Lomax, Alan Lomax) – 2:28
8. "Lord I've Been Changed" (Traditional; arranged by Waits and Brennan) – 2:28
  - Appears on Wicked Grin as "I Know I've Been Changed"
9. "Puttin' on the Dog" – 3:39
  - Appears in the film Liberty Heights (1999)
10. "Road to Peace" – 7:17
11. "All the Time" – 4:33
12. "The Return of Jackie and Judy" (Joey Ramone, Johnny Ramone, Dee Dee Ramone) – 3:28
  - Previously released on the Ramones tribute album We're a Happy Family: A Tribute to Ramones (2003)
13. "Walk Away" – 2:43
  - Previously released on the Dead Man Walking soundtrack recording (1996)
14. "Sea of Love" (Phil Phillips, George Khoury) – 3:43
  - Previously released on the Sea of Love soundtrack recording (1989)
15. "Buzz Fledderjohn" – 4:12
  - Previously released on the "Hold On" single (1999)
16. "Rains on Me" (Waits, Chuck E. Weiss) – 3:20
  - Previously released on Weiss's 1999 Extremely Cool then on Free the West Memphis 3 in 2000. This is the latter version.

==== Disc two: Bawlers ====
1. "Bend Down the Branches" – 1:06
  - Previously released on For the Kids (2002), an album featuring renditions of children's songs by various artists
2. "You Can Never Hold Back Spring" – 2:26
  - Originally appeared in Roberto Benigni's film The Tiger and the Snow (2005)
3. "Long Way Home" – 3:10
  - Previously released on the Big Bad Love soundtrack recording (2001)
  - Covered by Norah Jones on her album Feels like Home (2004)
4. "Widow's Grove" – 4:58
5. "Little Drop of Poison" – 3:09
  - Previously released on The End of Violence and Shrek 2 soundtrack recordings. The "End of Violence" version differs from this, which is the Shrek 2 version
6. "Shiny Things" – 2:20
  - Appears in Robert Wilson's production of Woyzeck, but not on the studio album of the score, Blood Money (2002)
7. "World Keeps Turning" – 4:16
  - Previously released on the Pollock (2001) soundtrack recording
8. "Tell It to Me" – 3:08
  - Previously recorded as a duet with Ramblin' Jack Elliott as "Louise (Tell It To Me)" on Elliott's Friends of Mine (1998). This version is in a different time signature from the original with Elliott.
9. "Never Let Go" – 3:13
  - Previously appeared on the soundtrack for Martin Bell's film American Heart (1992).
10. "Fannin Street" – 5:01
  - Appears on Wicked Grin (2001) performed by Hammond.
  - An homage to Lead Belly, who had a song titled Fannin Street (Mister Tom Hughes' Town).
11. "Little Man" (Teddy Edwards) – 4:33
  - Previously released on Edwards's Mississippi Lad (1991), released by Verve Records
12. "It's Over" – 4:40
  - Previously appeared in a different take on the Liberty Heights soundtrack
  - Appears in Wilson's Woyzeck, but not included on the studio album of the score, Blood Money
13. "If I Have to Go" – 2:15
  - Originally from Waits's 1986 musical Franks Wild Years, although not released on the studio album of the same name. The theme from the song was used under the title "Rat's Theme" in the documentary Streetwise (1984)
14. "Goodnight Irene" (Lead Belly, Gussie L. Davis) – 4:47
15. "The Fall of Troy" – 3:01
  - Previously released on the Dead Man Walking soundtrack recording
16. "Take Care of All My Children" – 2:31
  - Appears in Streetwise
17. "Down There by the Train" – 5:39
  - Appears on Johnny Cash's album American Recordings (1994) performed by Cash. This version appears in Long Gone (2003).
18. "Danny Says" (Joey Ramone, Johnny Ramone, Dee Dee Ramone) – 3:05
19. "Jayne's Blue Wish" – 2:29
  - Previously released on the Big Bad Love soundtrack recording
20. "Young at Heart" (Carolyn Leigh, Johnny Richards) – 3:41

==== Disc three: Bastards ====
1. "What Keeps Mankind Alive?" (Kurt Weill, Bertolt Brecht; translated by John Willett) – 2:09
  - From The Threepenny Opera
  - Previously released on the Hal Willner-produced Weill tribute album Lost in the Stars: The Music of Kurt Weill (1985)
2. "Children's Story" – 1:42
  - Based on Georg Büchner's Woyzeck (public domain)
3. "Heigh Ho" (Frank Churchill, Larry Morey) – 3:32
  - From the 1937 Walt Disney film Snow White And the Seven Dwarfs
  - Previously released on the Willner-produced Disney tribute album Stay Awake: Various Interpretations of Music from Vintage Disney Films (1988)
4. "Army Ants" – 3:25
  - "Insect facts gathered from The Worldbook Encyclopedia, Audubon Field Guide, reliable sources and the naked eye."
5. "Books of Moses" (Skip Spence) – 2:49
  - Previously released on More Oar, a 1999 various-artists tribute to Spence and his solo album Oar.
6. "Bone Chain" – 1:03
7. "Two Sisters" (Traditional; arranged by Waits and Brennan) – 4:55
8. "First Kiss" – 2:40
9. "Dog Door" (Waits, Brennan, Mark Linkous) – 2:43
  - With Sparklehorse; previously released on the Sparklehorse album It's a Wonderful Life (2001)
10. "Redrum" – 1:12
11. "Nirvana" – 2:12 (Charles Bukowski)
12. "Home I'll Never Be" – 2:28 (Jack Kerouac)
13. "Poor Little Lamb" (William J. Kennedy, Waits) – 1:43
14. "Altar Boy" – 2:48
  - Appears in Wilson's production of Alice, but not included on the 2002 studio album of the score, Alice; an earlier version can be found on The Alice Demos, under the title "What Became Of Old Father Craft?"
15. "The Pontiac" – 1:54
  - Previously released on the 1987 spoken word compilation Smack My Crack
16. "Spidey's Wild Ride" – 2:03
17. "King Kong" (Daniel Johnston) – 5:29
  - Previously released on the Johnston tribute album The Late Great Daniel Johnston: Discovered Covered (2004)
18. "On the Road" – 4:14 (Jack Kerouac)
  - Previously released on Jack Kerouac Reads On the Road (1999). Performed by Waits and Primus
19. "Dog Treat" (Hidden track) – 2:56
  - Live recording
20. "Missing My Son" (Hidden track) – 3:38

=== Vinyl ===
==== LPs one and two: Brawlers ====
Side A:

1. "Lie to Me" – 2:10
2. "LowDown" – 4:15
3. "2:19" – 5:02
4. "Fish in the Jailhouse" – 4:22

Side B:

1. "Bottom of the World" – 5:42
2. "Lucinda" – 4:52
3. "Ain't Goin' Down to the Well" – 2:28
4. "Lord I've Been Changed" – 2:28

Side C:

1. "Puttin' on the Dog" – 3:39
2. "Road to Peace" – 7:17
3. "All the Time" – 4:33

Side D:

1. "The Return of Jackie and Judy" – 3:28
2. "Walk Away" – 2:43
3. "Sea of Love" – 3:43
4. "Buzz Fledderjohn" – 4:12
5. "Rains on Me" – 3:20

==== LPs three and four: Bawlers ====
Side A:

1. "Bend Down the Branches" – 1:06
2. "You Can Never Hold Back Spring" – 2:26
3. "Long Way Home" – 3:10
4. "Widow's Grove" – 4:58
5. "Little Drop of Poison" – 3:09
6. "Shiny Things" – 2:20

Side B:

1. "World Keeps Turning" – 4:16
2. "Tell It to Me" – 3:08
3. "Never Let Go" – 3:13
4. "Fannin Street" – 5:01

Side C:

1. "Little Man" – 4:33
2. "It's Over" – 4:40
3. "If I Have to Go" – 2:15
4. "Goodnight Irene" – 4:47
5. "The Fall of Troy" – 3:01

Side D:

1. "Take Care of All My Children" – 2:31
2. "Down There By the Train" – 5:39
3. "Danny Says" – 3:05
4. "Jayne's Blue Wish" – 2:29
5. "Young at Heart" – 3:41

==== LPs five and six: Bastards ====
Side A:

1. "What Keeps Mankind Alive" – 2:09
2. "Children's Story" – 1:42
3. "Heigh Ho" – 3:32
4. "Army Ants" – 3:25
5. "Books of Moses" – 2:49

Side B:

1. "Bone Chain" – 1:03
2. "Two Sisters" – 4:55
3. "First Kiss" – 2:40
4. "Dog Door" – 2:43
5. "Redrum" – 1:12

Side C:

1. "Nirvana" – 2:12
2. "Home I'll Never Be" – 2:28
3. "Poor Little Lamb" – 1:43
4. "Altar Boy" – 2:48
5. "The Pontiac" – 1:54
6. "Spidey's Wild Ride" – 2:03

Side D:

1. "King Kong" – 5:29
2. "On the Road" – 4:14
3. "Dog Treat" – 2:56
4. "Missing My Son" – 3:38

==== LP seven: Bonus ====
Side A:

1. "Crazy 'Bout My Baby" (Fats Waller) – 2:04
2. "Diamond in Your Mind" – 5:08
  - Appears in Robert Wilson's production of Georg Büchner's unfinished 1837 play Woyzeck, but not included in the 2002 studio album of the score, Blood Money
3. "Cannon Song" (Kurt Weill) – 2:59
  - From the Threepenny Opera

Side B:

1. "Pray" – 2:59
2. "No One Can Forgive Me" – 4:56
  - Outtake from Bone Machine (1992)
3. "Mathie Grove" – 6:31
  - Traditional; arranged by Waits

== Personnel ==
- Tom Waits – vocals, guitar, pump organ, keyboards, percussion
- Dave Alvin – guitar
- Anges Amar – whistles
- Ara Anderson – trumpet
- Ray Armando – percussion
- Bobby Baloo – cowbells, boulders
- Bobby Black – steel guitar
- Michael Blair – drums, percussion
- Andrew Borger – percussion
- Brain – percussion
- Matt Brubeck – bass
- Dan Cantrell – accordion
- Ralph Carney – saxophone
- Crispin Cioe – saxophone
- Bent Clausen – banjo, piano
- Les Claypool – bass
- Jimmy Cleveland – trombone
- Harry K. Cody – banjo
- Greg Cohen – bass
- Eddie Davis – banjo
- Darrel Devore – circular violin
- Seth Ford-Young – bass
- Steve Foreman – percussion
- Mitchell Froom – chamberlin
- Bob Funk – trombone
- Joe Gore – guitar
- Chris Grady – trumpet
- Brett Gurewitz – guitar
- Ron Hacker – guitar
- John Hammond – harmonica
- Arno Hecht – saxophone
- Billy Higgins – drums
- Art Hillery – piano
- Stephen Hodges – percussion
- Bart Hopkin – bamboo clarinet
- Trevor Horn – bass
- Carla Kihlstedt – violin
- Guy Klucevsek – accordion
- Gary Knowlton – keyboards
- Mike Knowlton – guitar
- Larry LaLonde – guitar
- Adam Lane – bass
- Mark Linkous – guitar, bass, drums
- Paul "Hollywood" Litteral – trumpet
- Charlie Musselwhite – harmonica
- Tom Nunn – The Bug
- Eric Perney – bass
- Nic Phelps – horns
- Dan Plonsey – clarinet
- Steve Prutsman – piano
- Marc Ribot – guitar
- Bebe Risenfors – clarinet
- Gino Robair – percussion
- Mike Silverman – bass
- Jeff Sloan – percussion
- Nolan Smith – trumpet
- Matthew Sperry – bass
- Colin Stetson – saxophone
- Larry Taylor – bass
- Francis Thumm – piano
- Leroy Vinnegar – bass
- Casey Waits – drums
- Sullivan Waits – guitar
- Richard Waters – waterphone
- Tom Yoder – trombone

== Charts and certifications ==
=== Weekly charts ===
Chart (2006)	Peak position
Australian Albums (ARIA)	59
Austrian Albums (Ö3 Austria)	15
Belgian Albums (Ultratop Flanders)	4
Belgian Albums (Ultratop Wallonia)	49
Canadian Albums (Nielsen SoundScan)	44
Danish Albums (Hitlisten)	5
Dutch Albums (Album Top 100)	5
Finnish Albums (Suomen virallinen lista)	18
French Albums (SNEP)	46
German Albums (Offizielle Top 100)	26
Irish Albums (IRMA)	25
Italian Albums (FIMI)	18
Norwegian Albums (VG-lista)	4
Portuguese Albums (AFP)	17
Scottish Albums (Official Charts)	38
Spanish Albums (Promusicae)	32
Swedish Albums (Sverigetopplistan)	6
Swiss Albums (Schweizer Hitparade)	22
UK Albums (Official Charts)	49
US Billboard 200	74
US Top Rock Albums (Billboard)	23

=== Year-end charts ===
Chart (2006)	Position
Belgian Albums (Ultratop Flanders)	71

=== Certifications ===
Region	Certification	Certified units/sales
Canada (Music Canada)	Gold	50,000^{^}
Netherlands (NVPI)	Gold	35,000^{^}
United States (RIAA)	Gold	500,000^{^}
^{^} Shipments figures based on certification alone.
