= The Black Rider (album) =

Studio album by Tom Waits
- Released: September 1993
- Recorded: 1989, 1993
- Genres: Experimental; avant-garde; chamber rock; dark cabaret
- Length: 56:08
- Label: Island
- Producer: Tom Waits

Tom Waits chronology
Bone Machine (1992)	The Black Rider (1993)	Mule Variations (1999)

The Black Rider is the twelfth studio album by Tom Waits, released in 1993 on Island Records. It features studio versions of songs Waits wrote for the play The Black Rider (1990), directed by Robert Wilson and co-written by William S. Burroughs. The play is based on the German short story The Fatal Marksman by Johann August Apel, which had previously been made into an opera by Carl Maria von Weber. It is about a clerk who makes a Faustian bargain for magic bullets, with tragic results. The play premiered on March 31, 1990, at the Thalia Theater in Hamburg, Germany. Its world English-language premiere occurred in 1998 at the Edmonton International Fringe Festival. Per the Los Angeles Times, "It's most easily described as a Faustian musical-tragicomedy."

Waits also collaborated with Wilson on Alice (1992) and Woyzeck (2000); the songs for those were released in 2002 on the albums Alice and Blood Money, respectively.

== Background ==
Per Will Pinfold,

The German genesis of the Black Rider project is important, not only because the play – whose full title was The Black Rider: The Casting of the Magic Bullets – was based on a German folk tale, but because the album's sound is distinctly European. A collision of avant-garde classical music, Northern European folk music and the decadent cabaret of Weimar Republic era Germany, the music was matched on stage with a striking visual sense influenced by the German Expressionist theater and cinema of the 1920s. At the same time, 10 years on from Swordfishtrombones, the album takes its cue from that album's generally very un-rock'n'roll musical texture; a melange of instruments that falls somewhere between homespun, pawn shop folksiness – banjo, accordion, viola – and actually home-made weirdness – bowed saw, unidentifiable percussion and stomping feet.

Waits is credited with the lyrics for all of the songs except for "That's The Way", "Flash Pan Hunter" and "Crossroads", credited to Burroughs, and "'T'Ain't No Sin", a jazz standard by Walter Donaldson and Edgar Leslie and performed by Burroughs on the album. "Crossroads" alludes to Burroughs's experiences with addiction: "You think you can take them bullets or leave 'em, do you? Just save a few for your bad days. Well now we all have those bad days when you can't hit for shit. The more of them magics you use, the more bad days you have without 'em." Burroughs said: "I had the idea of comparing the magic bullet in the original German story to heroin. Once you use one, you'll use another. Tom said, 'Yeah, and the first one's always free' and of course that went right in."

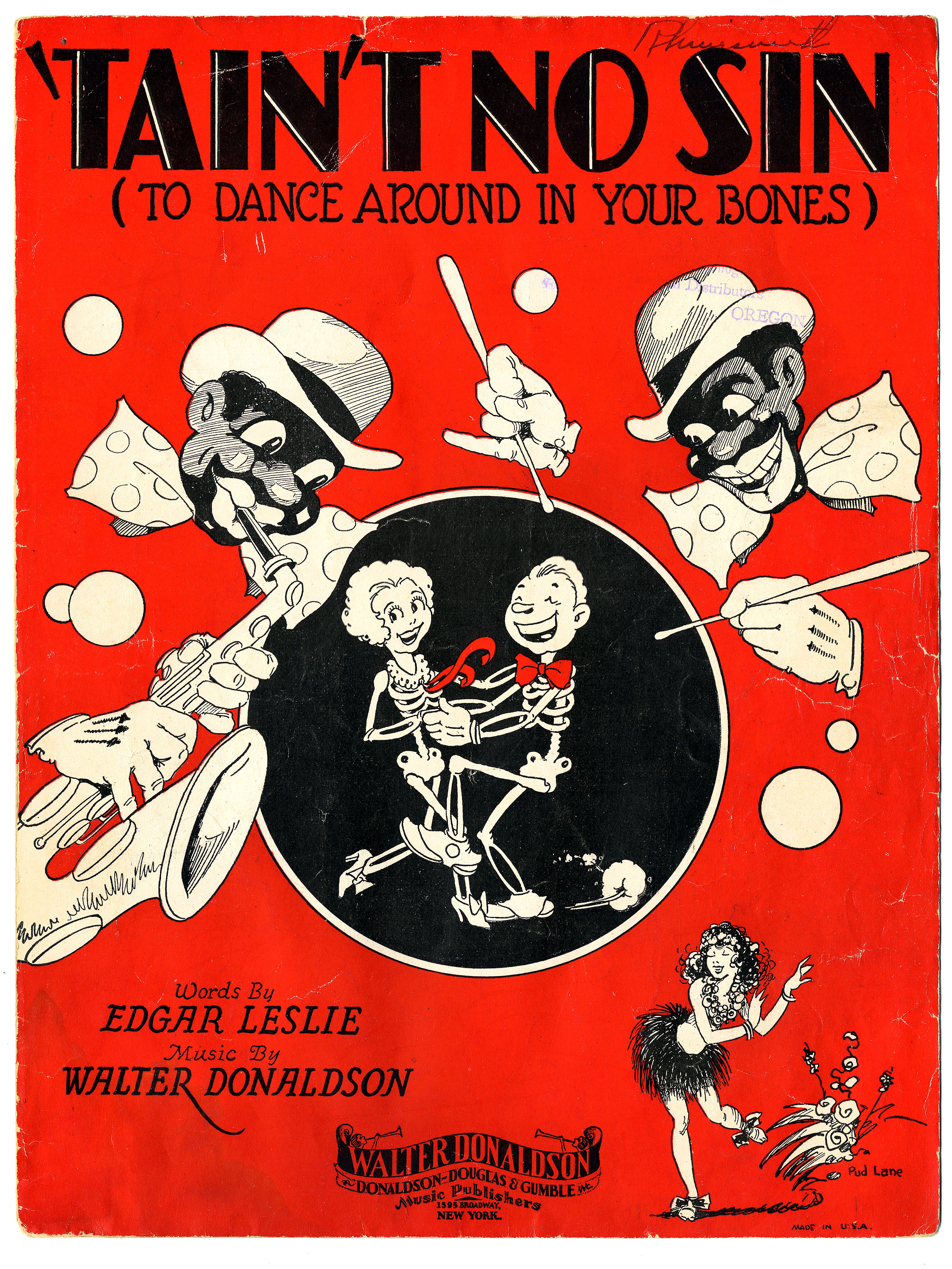
"'Tain't No Sin (To Dance Around in Your Bones)" sheet music, 1929 (9609174465)

== Reception ==
Professional ratings
Review scores
Source	Rating
AllMusic	2/5 stars
Chicago Tribune	3/4 stars
Entertainment Weekly	B
Los Angeles Times	3/4 stars
Mojo	3/5 stars
NME	8/10
Q	3/5 stars
Rolling Stone	4/5 stars
The Rolling Stone Album Guide	2/5 stars
Select	4/5

Lorraine Ari of Rolling Stone gave the album four out of five stars: "Just when it seemed that Los Angeles' premier bar casualty could not get any weirder, on his 15th album, Tom Waits teams up with beat writer William Burroughs (who turns up one song) to score a 19th century opera...The rich, dizzying tunes incorporate graveyard fright noises, bizarre piano sounds and creepy sci-fi whistles into traditional, orchestrated Fiddler on the Roof-style melodies... Although this odd, operatic collaboration with Burroughs and Wilson does not completely fit in with the whiskey-and-bar-stool concept of Waits' previous albums, it does continue his intriguing expansion into more surreal realms. His dervishlike approach to The Black Rider makes you gawk like a freakshow spectator in fear, fascination and delight."

Chris Willman of the Los Angeles Times gave the album three out of four stars: "The story line is only partially apparent in this score, with Waits taking particular relish in essaying Scratch as another one of his carnival barker characters. Mostly it sounds a lot like the next Tom Waits album, with much the same unholy mixture of calliope-like chamber music, brutally melodic percussion and tortured lyricism as last year's Bone Machine. This isn't quite as superior a collection of songs as that was--but once again, cut through all the clatter and you'll find some terrific ballad writing: 'November has tied me / To an old dead tree / Get word to April / To rescue me.' Most song-crafters would sell their souls to write lines as good as those."

Will Pinfold writes in Spectrum Culture:

The album's most effective songs are perhaps those that draw on the wilder side of European folk music and meld it with cabaret, such as "Just the Right Bullets," and the full-blooded romance of the stomping instrumental "Russian Dance," but it's an album full of unnerving and off-kilter delights. William Burroughs was an icon of the 20th century and a great writer, but the aural evidence suggests that, alas, he may have been tone deaf. The comic-macabre old show tune "'T'Ain't No Sin," with its refrain "'T'ain't no sin to take off your skin/ And dance around in your bones," is a perfect fit for The Black Rider, but there's a certain amount of irony in hearing Burroughs croak, "When you hear sweet syncopation/ And the music softly moans," out of time and in no musical key recognised by medical science. Still, the song is a queasy treat; Waits must have known how it sounded when he recorded it.

The Black Rider has the distinction of being probably the most extreme album in Tom Waits' entire oeuvre, not so much for its individual songs as for the contrasts between them. Along the way it includes what is undoubtedly – a bold claim, but true – some of Waits's ugliest music... but alongside those are some of the most hauntingly beautiful ballads he has ever written. "November" opens with the unearthly, theremin-like sound of a bowed saw, and the song is essentially a catalogue of morbid, gloomy wintry imagery set to an organic, skeletal soundtrack of plucked banjo, accordion and pleasingly woody bass notes. Waits' voice is at its expressive, elemental best and some of the lyrics, which conjure a dark, backwoods mysticism, are astoundingly nasty for such a pretty song: "With my hair slicked back/ With carrion shellac/ And blood from a pheasant/ And the bone from a hare..." Just as beautiful but less morbid and cold, "The Briar and the Rose" is a ballad of almost Victorian sentimentality. Its lyrics sound folkloric or even fairytale-like in their language, as with, "I fell asleep down by the stream/ And there I had the strangest dream/ Down by Brennan's Glen there grows/ A briar and a rose."

== Track listing ==
All tracks are written by Tom Waits, except where noted.

The Black Rider
No.	Title	Lyrics	Music	Length
1.	"Lucky Day Overture"			2:27
2.	"The Black Rider"			3:21
3.	"November"			2:53
4.	"Just the Right Bullets"			3:35
5.	"Black Box Theme" (instrumental)			2:42
6.	"'T'Ain't No Sin"	Edgar Leslie	Walter Donaldson	2:26
7.	"Flash Pan Hunter/Intro" (instrumental)			1:10
8.	"That's the Way"	William S. Burroughs		1:07
9.	"The Briar and the Rose"			3:50
10.	"Russian Dance" (instrumental)			3:12
11.	"Gospel Train/Orchestra" (instrumental)			2:33
12.	"I'll Shoot the Moon"			3:51
13.	"Flash Pan Hunter"	Burroughs		3:10
14.	"Crossroads"	Burroughs		2:43
15.	"Gospel Train"			4:43
16.	"Interlude" (instrumental)		Greg Cohen	0:17
17.	"Oily Night"			4:23
18.	"Lucky Day"			3:42
19.	"The Last Rose of Summer"			2:07
20.	"Carnival" (instrumental)			1:15

Note: The play contains two additional songs not included on the album: "Chase the Clouds Away" and "In the Morning".

== Personnel ==
- Tom Waits - banjo (3), calliope (1), Chamberlin (5, 14, 19–20), congas (15), guitar (14), Emax-sampler (6, 10), log drum (15), marimba (6), noises (10), organ (2, 18–19), piano (2, 4), train whistle (15), vocals (1–4, 12–15, 18–19)
- Gerd Bessler - viola (14)
- Hans-Jörn Braudenburg - organ (8–9)
- Kathleen Brennan - noises (10)
- Matt Brubeck - cello (1, 4–5, 10–13, 17–18)
- William S. Burroughs - vocals (6)
- Clive Butters - noises (10)
- Ralph Carney - bass clarinet (4, 11, 13, 15, 17), saxophone (1, 12, 17), tuba (18)
- Greg Cohen - accordion (3), banjo (2), bass (2–3, 14–15, 19–20), bass clarinet (6, 11), Emax-sampler (6), percussion (2, 15), viola (2)
- Linda Deluca - viola (10–11, 17)
- Bill Douglass - bass (1, 4–5, 10–13, 15, 17–18)
- Joe Gore- banjo (1, 4–5, 13, 17), guitar (11–13, 17–18)
- Volker Hemken- clarinet (7–9, 16)
- Joe Marquez - noises (10)
- Christoph Moinian - French horn (16)
- Don Neely - saw (3, 5, 13)
- Nick Phelps - French horn (1, 5, 11, 17)
- Kevin Porter - trombone (1, 11–12, 17)
- Larry Rhodes - bassoon (4–5, 11, 13), contrabassoon (17)
- Stefan Schäfer - bass (7–9)
- Henning Stoll - bassoon (16), contrabassoon (7), viola (8–9)
- Francis Thumm - noises (10), organ (4, 12–13)
- Kenny Wollesen - marimba (12), percussion (1, 4–5, 11–13, 17–18)

Recorded in 1989 by Gerd Bessler at his Music Factory in Hamburg, Germany (2, 3, 6–9, 14–16, 19, 20), and in 1993 by Tchad Blake and assisted by Joe Marquez at the Prairie Sun Recording Studios in Cotati, California (1, 4, 5, 10–13, 17, 18). Musical Director Greg Cohen. All songs mixed by Biff Dawes At Sunset Sound Factory, Hollywood, California.

Hans-Jörn Braudenburg, Volker Hemken, Henning Stoll, Christoph Moinian, Dieter Fischer, Jo Bauer, Frank Wulff, and Stefan Schäfer were The Devil's Rhubato Band (Hamburg); Ralph Carney, Bill Douglas, Kenny Wollesen, Matt Brubeck, Joe Gore, Nick Phelps, Kevin Porter, Lawrence "Larry" Rhodes, Francis Thumm, Don Neely, Linda Deluca were The Rhubato West Group (San Francisco).

== Charts ==
Chart performance for The Black Rider
Chart (1993)	Peak position
Canada Top Albums/CDs (RPM)	60
UK Albums (Official Charts)	47
US Billboard 200	130

Chart performance for The Black Rider (30th Anniversary Edition)
Chart (2023)	Peak position
Swiss Albums (Schweizer Hitparade)	88
