= Innocent When You Dream (song) =

Song by Tom Waits

from the album Franks Wild Years
- Released: August 1987
- Recorded: Sunset Sound Factory, Los Angeles, CA; Los Angeles, Universal Recording Corp., Chicago, IL
- Genre: Experimental rock
- Length: 4:15
- Label: Island
- Songwriter(s): Tom Waits
- Producer(s): Tom Waits

Innocent When You Dream is a song by Tom Waits appearing on his tenth studio album Franks Wild Years. The song was used as the soundtrack to the closing sequence, Auggie Wren's Christmas Story, in the 1995 film, Smoke.

== Accolades ==
| Year | Publication | Country | Accolade | Rank |
|---|---|---|---|---|
| 2000 | Elvis Costello | United Kingdom | The Best Songs from the 500 Best Albums Ever | * |
| 2005 | Bruce Pollock | United States | The 7,500 Most Important Songs of 1944–2000 | * |
| 2006 | Blow Up | Italy | 100 Songs to Remember | 18 |
| 2011 | Toby Creswell | Australia | 1001 Songs | * |

(*) designates unordered lists.

== Personnel ==
Adapted from the Franks Wild Years liner notes.

- Tom Waits – vocals

Musicians

- Ralph Carney – violin
- William Shimmel – piano

Production and additional personnel

- Biff Dawes – recording, mixing
- Danny Leake – recording
- Howie Weinberg – mastering

== See also ==
- Tom Waits discography
