= The Sons of Lee Marvin =

Tongue-in-cheek secret society

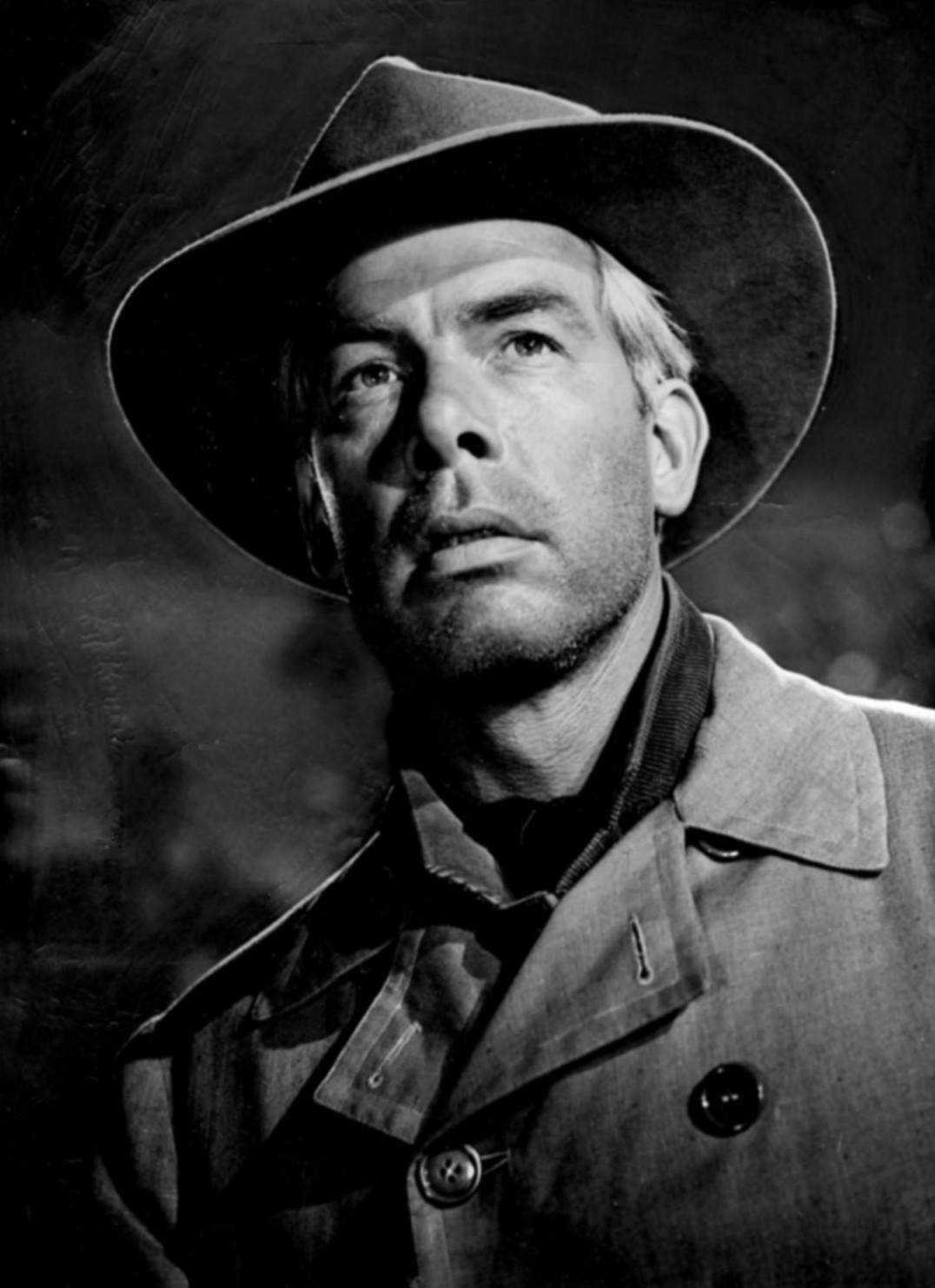
Actor Lee Marvin (1924–1987), to whom the society is devoted

The Sons of Lee Marvin is a tongue-in-cheek secret society devoted to iconic American actor Lee Marvin. The sole entry requirement for the club is that one must have a physical resemblance to plausibly look like a son of Marvin.

Founding member and film director Jim Jarmusch explained, "If you look like you could be a son of Lee Marvin, then you are instantly thought of by the Sons of Lee Marvin to be a Son of Lee Marvin".

== Members ==
Besides Jarmusch, the founding members of the society are said to include the actors and musicians Tom Waits, John Lurie, and Richard Boes. Musician Nick Cave, whom Jarmusch knew when living in Berlin, was inducted as a member after having been mistaken for a brother of the director. Director John Boorman is an honorary member, having been presented with one of the society's elaborate Waits-designed business cards. Others rumored to be members include Thurston Moore, Iggy Pop, Josh Brolin and Neil Young though none has been formally recognized by the society, which refuses to disclose its inner workings to the public. The society meets occasionally, ostensibly to watch Lee Marvin films together.

== Mythology ==
The society's members perpetuate the joke in the media. Tom Waits described it to Rolling Stone in 1986 as "somewhere between the Elks Club and the Academy Awards", and claimed to have met Jarmusch at an annual meeting of the New York chapter. When asked about the society by friend and collaborator Lucy Sante in a 1989 interview, Jarmusch commented "I'm not at liberty to divulge information about the organization, other than to tell you that it does exist. I can identify three other members of the organization: Tom Waits, John Lurie, and Richard Boes ... You have to have a facial structure such that you could be related to, or be a son of, Lee Marvin. There are no women, obviously, in the organization. We have communiques and secret meetings. Other than that, I can't talk about it." Jarmusch revealed in a 1992 interview that the real son of Lee Marvin, Christopher, had objected to the existence of the organization in an encounter with Waits at a bar:

Six months ago Tom Waits was in a bar in somewhere like Sonoma County in Northern California, and the bartender said, “You’re Tom Waits, right? A guy over there wants to talk to you.”

Tom went over to this dark corner booth and the guy sitting there said, “Sit down, I want to talk to you.”

So Tom started getting a little aggressive: “What the fuck do you want to talk to me about? I don’t know you.”

And the guy said, “What is this bullshit about the Sons of Lee Marvin?”

Tom said, “Well, it’s a secret organization and I’m not supposed to talk about it.”

The guy said, “I don’t like it.”

Tom said, “What’s it to you?”

The guy said, “I’m Lee Marvin’s son”—and he really was. He thought it was insulting, but it’s not, it’s completely out of respect for Lee Marvin.

— Jim Jarmusch, in interview with Film Comment, June 1992

Christopher Marvin, a professional drummer and the only son of Lee Marvin, featured as a guest artist on the song "Cold Water" from Waits's album Mule Variations (1999).

== The Sons ==
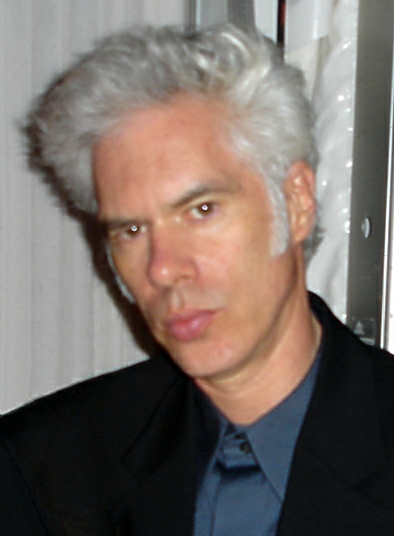
Jim Jarmusch

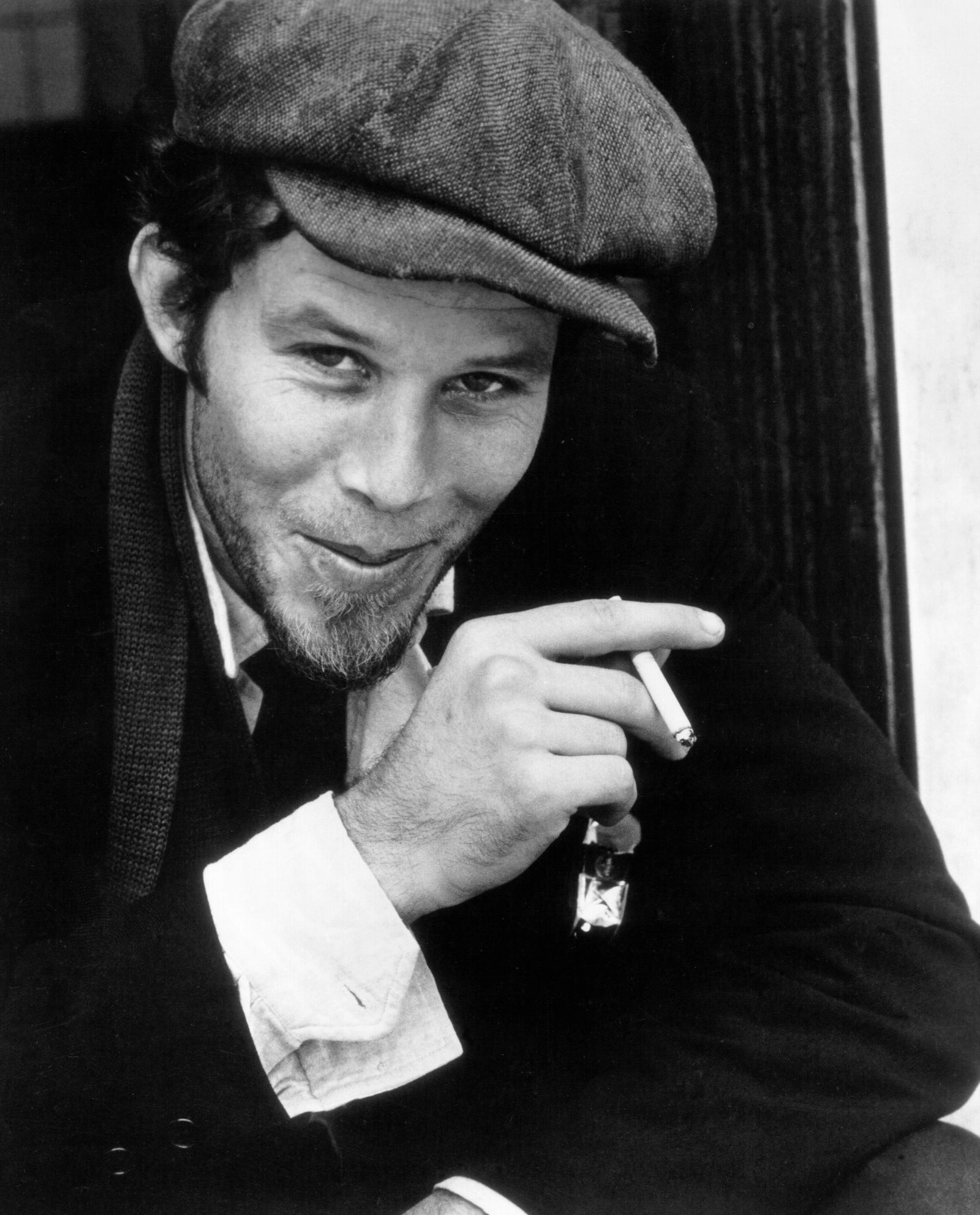
Tom Waits

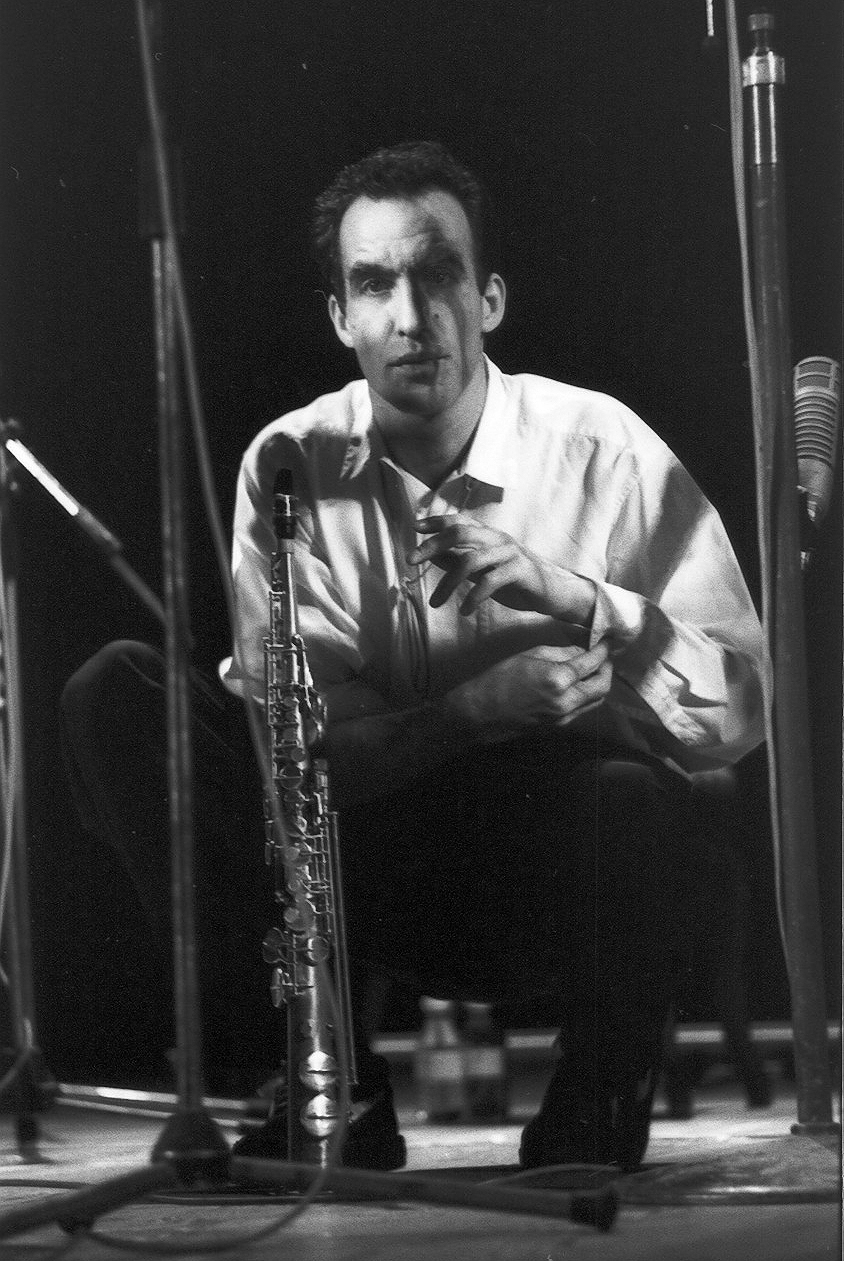
John Lurie

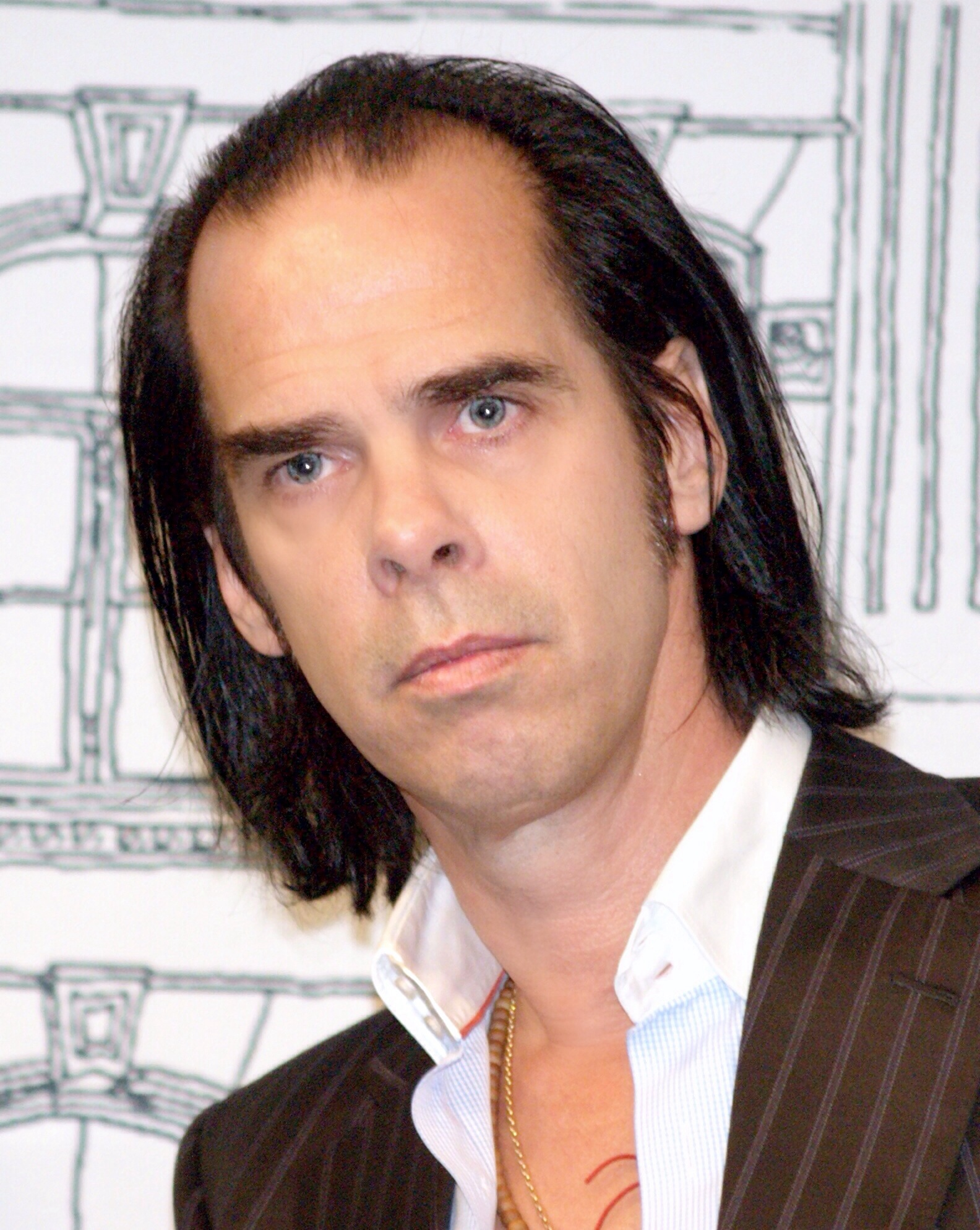
Nick Cave

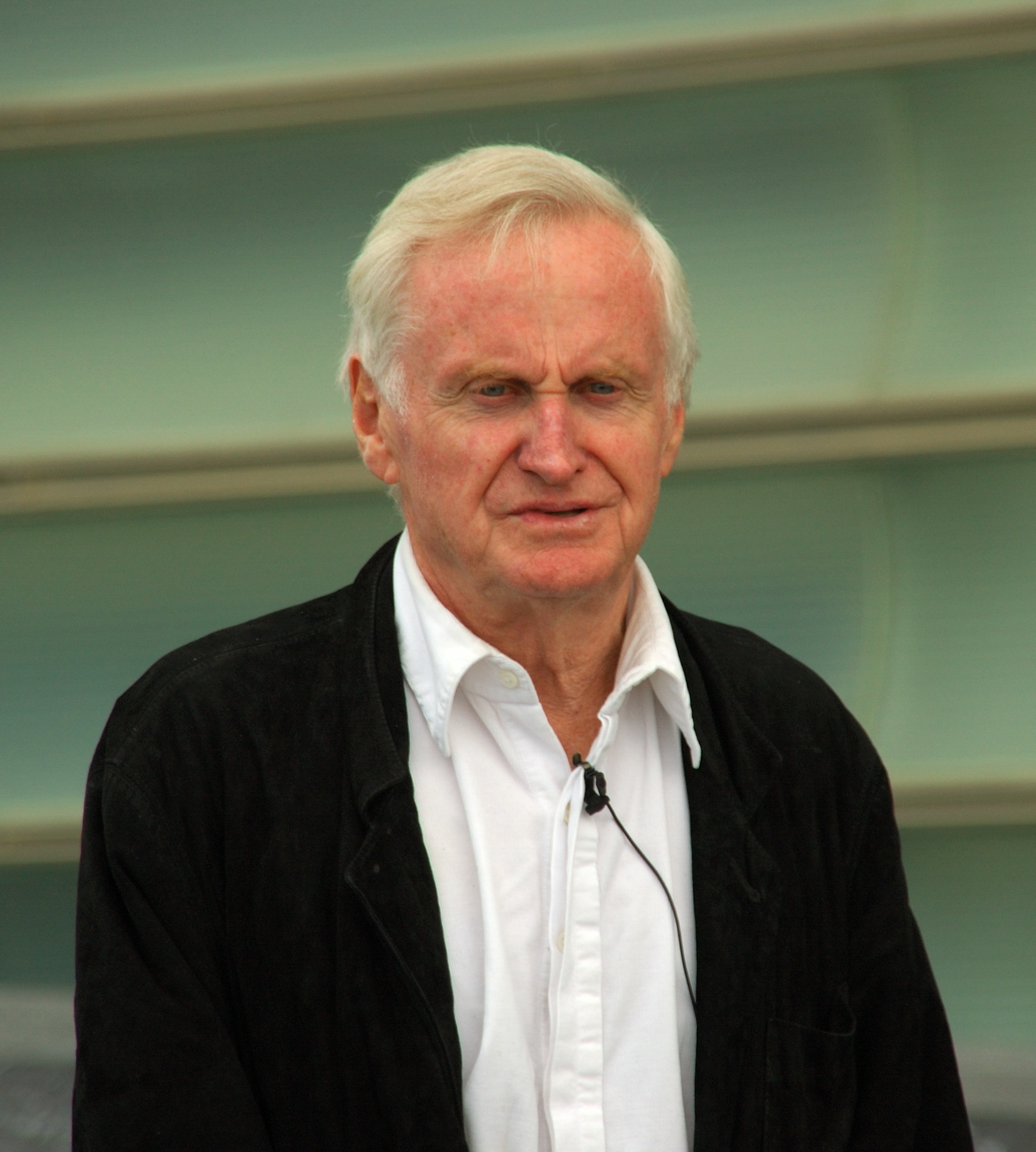
John Boorman (honorary member)

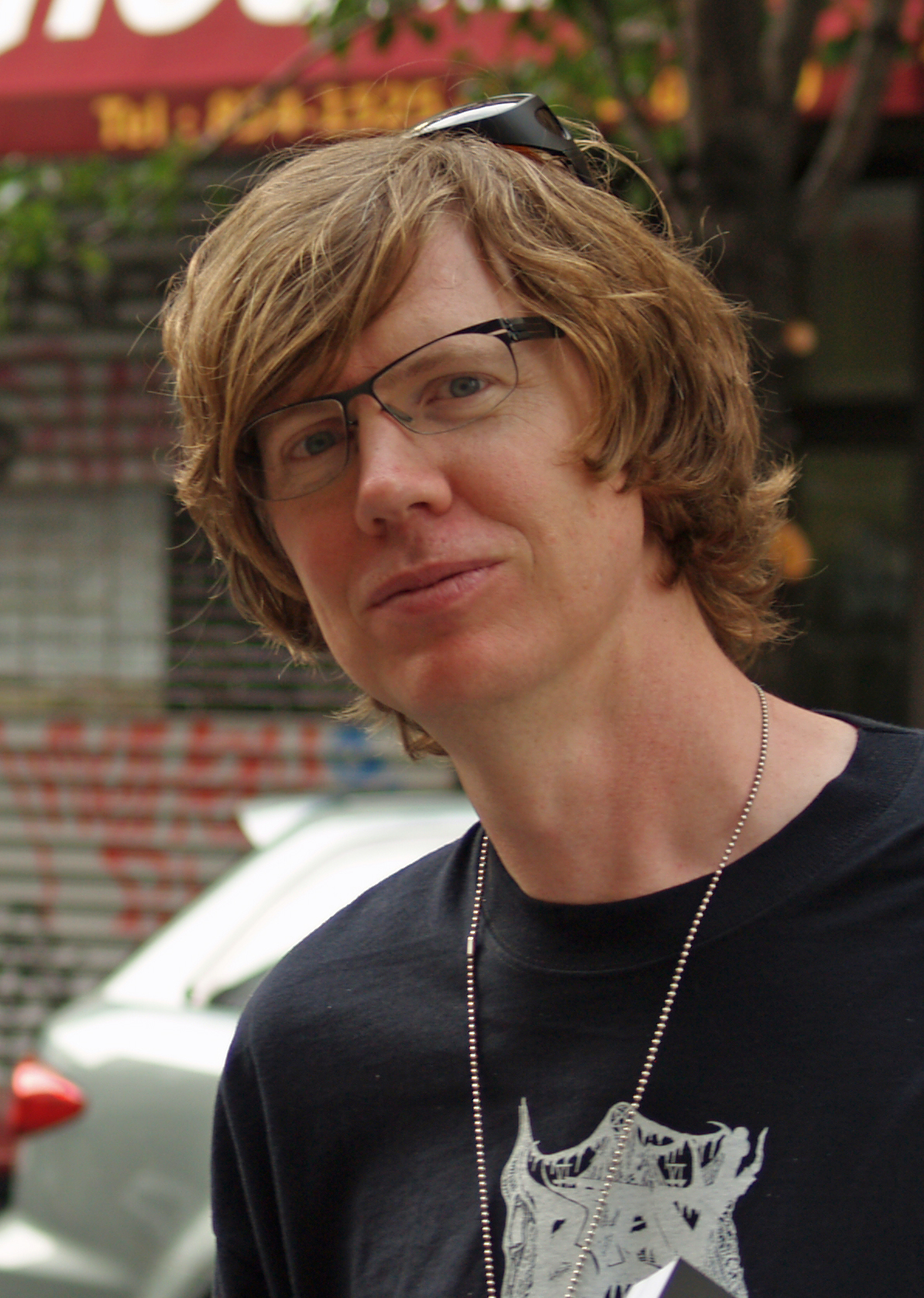
Thurston Moore

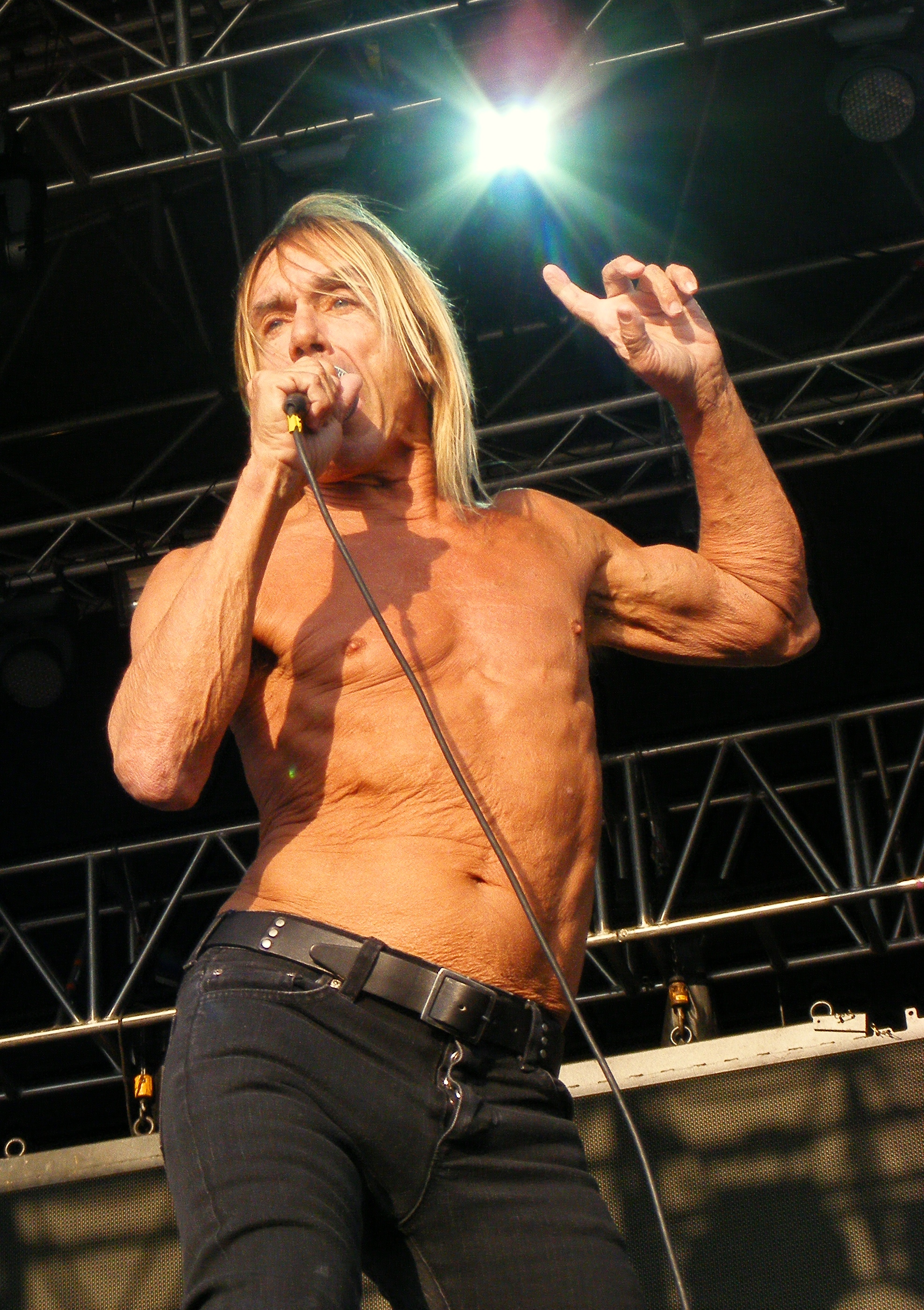
Iggy Pop

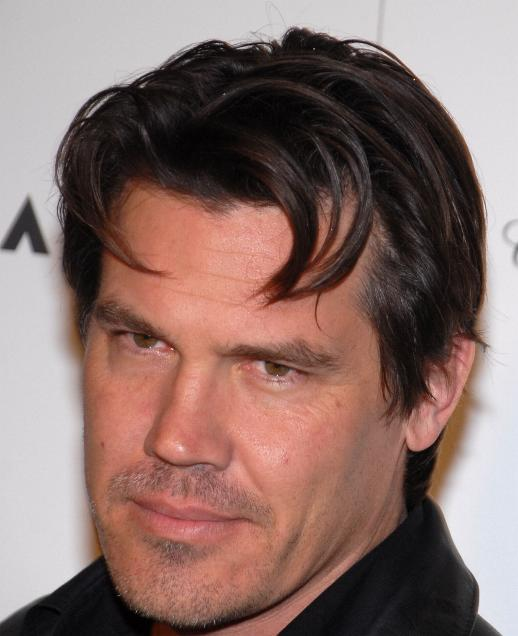
Josh Brolin

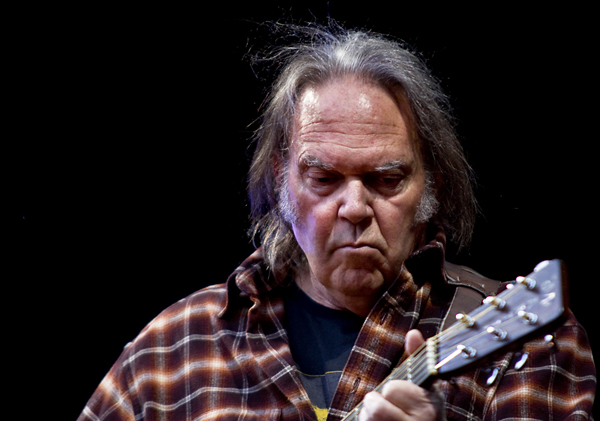
Neil Young

== Citations ==
=== References ===
- Hertzberg, Ludvig (2001), Jim Jarmusch: Interviews, Jackson: University Press of Mississippi, ISBN 1-57806-379-5
