= Mule Variations =

Studio album by Tom Waits
- Released: April 16, 1999
- Recorded: 1998
- Studio: Prairie Sun (Cotati, California)
- Genre: Experimental rock; blues
- Length: 70:33
- Label: Anti-
- Producer: Kathleen Brennan, Tom Waits

Tom Waits chronology
The Black Rider (1993)	Mule Variations (1999)	Alice (2002)

Singles from Mule Variations
- 1. "Hold On"

Mule Variations is the thirteenth studio album by American musician Tom Waits, released on April 16, 1999, on the ANTI- label. It was Waits' first studio album in six years, following The Black Rider (1993). The album was backed by an extensive tour in Europe and North America during the summer and autumn of 1999, which was Waits' first proper tour since 1987. Other promotional stops included a solo performance on VH1 Storytellers.

Mule Variations won a Grammy Award for Best Contemporary Folk Album and was nominated for Best Male Rock Performance for the track "Hold On". It has sold more than 500,000 copies worldwide. In 2012, the album was ranked number 416 on Rolling Stone's list of The 500 Greatest Albums of All Time.

== Reception ==
Professional ratings
Review scores
Source	Rating
AllMusic	4/5 stars
Entertainment Weekly	B+
The Guardian	4/5 stars
Los Angeles Times	4/4 stars
NME	7/10
Pitchfork	9.5/10
Rolling Stone	3/5 stars
The Rolling Stone Album Guide	4.5/5 stars
Spin	6/10
The Village Voice	A−

Upon its release, Mule Variations received widespread critical acclaim. AllMusic reviewer Stephen Thomas Erlewine stated that "the album uses the ragged cacophony of Bone Machine as a starting point, and proceeds to bring in the songwriterly aspects of Rain Dogs, along with its affection for backstreet and backwoods blues, plus a hint of the beatnik qualities of Swordfish. So Mule Variations delivers what fans want, in terms of both songs and sonics" and awarded the album four out of five stars. Former Village Voice editor Robert Christgau gave the album an A− rating and praised the songwriting of Waits and his wife Kathleen Brennan, saying "together they humanize the percussion-battered Bone Machine sound, reconstituting his '80s alienation effects into a Delta harshness with more give to it." David Browne of Entertainment Weekly said that Mule Variations "restores the wizened humanity – and a more traditional sense of songcraft – to [Waits'] music", gave the album a B+ rating and concluded that Waits was "the last of the classic American tunesmiths."

Hot Press reviewer Peter Murphy described the album as "an emotionally forthright record" and called it "a record of at least two minds: scuffed rooming-house madrigals [...] contrasted with big, fat, bleeding heart ballads." Zach Hooker of Pitchfork awarded the album a 9.5 out of 10 rating, describing it as "a great album" and further saying that "sonically, it picks up where Bone Machine left off, but drops some of that album's artifice: the clattering, trebly out-back-of-the-shed sound is still here and the inexplicable presence of Primus persists." Rolling Stone said that the album "contains the most blues of any album [Tom Waits has] made" but added "the problem is that it's more of the same", describing it as "the latest installment of discourse" and awarding the album three out of five stars.

Mule Variations was a moderate commercial success. The album charted in 14 countries worldwide upon its release, including debuting at number 30 on the United States Billboard 200 and number 1 on Norway's album chart. The album was certified gold in Canada in July 2001 after selling over 50,000 copies and as of April 2009 had sold more than 500,000 copies worldwide. Mule Variations won the Grammy Award for Best Contemporary Folk Album at the 42nd Grammy Awards and was nominated for Best Male Rock Vocal Performance.

In 2010, Mule Variations was awarded a platinum certification from the Independent Music Companies Association, which indicated sales of at least 500,000 copies throughout Europe. As of 2006, sales in the United States have exceeded 440,000 copies, according to Nielsen SoundScan.

== Track listing ==
All tracks are written by Tom Waits and Kathleen Brennan unless otherwise noted.

No.	Title	Writer(s)	Length
1.	"Big in Japan"		4:05
2.	"Lowside of the Road"		2:59
3.	"Hold On"		5:33
4.	"Get Behind the Mule"		6:52
5.	"House Where Nobody Lives"	Waits	4:14
6.	"Cold Water"		5:23
7.	"Pony"	Waits	4:32
8.	"What's He Building?"	Waits	3:20
9.	"Black Market Baby"		5:02
10.	"Eyeball Kid"		4:25
11.	"Picture in a Frame"		3:39
12.	"Chocolate Jesus"		3:55
13.	"Georgia Lee"		4:24
14.	"Filipino Box Spring Hog"	Waits	3:09
15.	"Take It with Me"		4:24
16.	"Come On Up to the House"		4:36
Total length:			70:33

Australian, New Zealand and Japanese bonus tracks
No.	Title	Writer(s)	Length
17.	"Buzz Fledderjohn"	Waits	4:14
18.	"Big Face Money"	Waits, Casey Waits	0:38
Total length:			75:25

== Personnel ==
- Tom Waits - vocals (1–7, 9–16), The Voice (8), guitar (1–3, 6–7, 9, 12), piano (5, 11, 13, 15–16), organ (3), pump organ (7), percussion (9–10), Chamberlin (9), optigan (2)
- Andrew Borger - drums (9, 14, 16), percussion (14)
- Ralph Carney - trumpet (1), saxophone (1, 16), alto saxophone (11), bass clarinet (10), reeds (8, 9)
- Les Claypool - bass (1)
- Greg Cohen - bass (11–12, 15), percussion (10)
- Linda Deluca-Ghidossi - violin (13)
- Dalton Dillingham III - bass (13)
- Joe Gore - guitar (3, 16)
- Chris Grady - trumpet (2, 14)
- John Hammond - blues harp (7)
- Stephen Hodges - percussion (3–4)
- Smokey Hormel - guitar (4), dobro (7), chumbus, dousengoni (2)
- Jacquire King - programming (2, 14), recording engineer, mixing
- Larry LaLonde - guitar (1)
- Bryan "Brain" Mantia - drums (1)
- Christopher Marvin - drums (6)
- Charlie Musselwhite - blues harp (4, 12, 14, 16)
- Nik Phelps - baritone saxophone (11, 16)
- DJ M. Mark "The III Media" Reitman - turntable (8–10, 14)
- Larry Rhodes - contrabassoon (10)
- Marc Ribot - guitar (3, 9–10, 14), lead guitar (5), guitar solo (6, 9)
- Jeff Sloan - percussion (8)
- Larry Taylor - bass (3–6, 14, 16), guitar (14), rhythm guitar (5)
- Wings Over Jordan Gospel, Bali Eternal - turntable samples (10)

Technical

- Oz Fritz - recording engineer, mixing
- Matt Mahurin - cover photography

Christopher Marvin, the son of actor Lee Marvin, was featured as a guest drummer as a nod to Waits' membership in the Sons of Lee Marvin, a humorous secret society of Marvin look-alikes.

== Charts ==
=== Weekly charts ===
Chart (1999)	Peak position
Australian Albums (ARIA)	13
Austrian Albums (Ö3 Austria)	7
Belgian Albums (Ultratop Flanders)	2
Canadian Albums (Billboard)	17
Dutch Albums (Album Top 100)	12
Finnish Albums (Suomen virallinen lista)	11
French Albums (SNEP)	22
German Albums (Offizielle Top 100)	4
New Zealand Albums (RMNZ)	36
Norwegian Albums (VG-lista)	1
Scottish Albums (OCC)	17
Swedish Albums (Sverigetopplistan)	7
Swiss Albums (Schweizer Hitparade)	7
UK Albums (OCC)	9
US Billboard 200	30

=== Year-end charts ===
Chart (1999)	Position
Belgian Albums (Ultratop Flanders)	83
German Albums (Offizielle Top 100)	75

== Certifications ==
Region	Certification	Certified units/sales
Canada (Music Canada)	Gold	50,000^{^}
Netherlands (NVPI)	Platinum	100,000^{^}
United States (RIAA)	Gold	500,000^{^}
Summaries
Europe	—	500,000
Worldwide	—	1,000,000
^{^} Shipments figures based on certification alone.
