= Real Gone (album) =

Studio album by Tom Waits
- Released: October 4, 2004
- Genres: Experimental rock; alternative hip-hop
- Length: 71:52
- Label: ANTI-
- Producers: Kathleen Brennan, Tom Waits

Tom Waits chronology
Blood Money (2002)	Real Gone (2004)	Orphans: Brawlers, Bawlers & Bastards (2006)

Real Gone is the sixteenth studio album by Tom Waits, released on October 4, 2004, in Europe, and October 5 in the United States on the ANTI- label. The album was supported by the Real Gone Tour, playing sold-out locations in North America and Europe in October and November 2004. It was chosen by the editors of Harp Magazine as the best album of 2004.

The album features some of the few political songs Waits has written, the most explicit being "Day After Tomorrow", a song Waits has described as an "elliptical" protest against the Iraq War.

A remixed, remastered version of the album was released by ANTI- on November 22, 2017, with the remastering process personally overseen by Waits and Kathleen Brennan.

== Background ==
According to ANTI-:

Written and produced by Tom Waits and Kathleen Brennan, his wife and long-time collaborator, Real Gone features 15 tracks of funk, Jamaican rock-steady, blues both urban and rural, rhythms and melodies both Latin and African and, for the first time, no piano. The crash and collide of rhythms and genres within a song creates a hybrid unlike any music he has and the sonic mayhem and nonsense rhyme ride to "Top of the Hill" are both punctuated by a live band and turntable playing along to Waits' home recorded voice percussion.

The album features Waits beatboxing on tracks like "Top of the Hill" and "Metropolitan Glide". He had picked up the technique from his interest in hip-hop. Guitarist Marc Ribot plays in a Cuban style on "Hoist That Rag", as he had on The Prosthetic Cubans.

The album features references to real people and events. "Don't Go Into That Barn" was based on a New York Times story about a slave jail in Kentucky. The article quotes Isaac Lang Jr.: "Dad told us never to go in there...He said, 'Boys, I'm going to tell you the truth. It's all right to play around that barn, but don't go inside.' He said it just wasn't right. That it was pitiful. He never did tell us why." The article quotes Carl Westmoreland: "It was a slave ship turned upside down," a line echoed by Waits.

== Production and remix ==
In 2017, Waits announced he would remix the whole album in order to give it "a sound and texture originally envisioned by the artist". The remixed and remastered version of the album was released in November that year.

== Reception ==
Professional ratings
Aggregate scores
Source	Rating
Metacritic	78/100
Review scores
Source	Rating
AllMusic	3.5/5 stars
Blender	4/5 stars
Entertainment Weekly	B+
The Guardian	4/5 stars
Mojo	4/5 stars
NME	7/10
Pitchfork	8.0/10
Q	2/5 stars
Rolling Stone	3/5 stars
Spin	A−

Critical reception was generally positive. A review in Paste found the album interesting but criticised the excessive length of various songs and one track in particular, "Circus", finding it was bordering on self-parody. Pitchfork praised the lyrics and the singing, stating Waits was "beating out his peers in both absurdity and grace". A retrospective review on Elsewhere insisted that, although the album might have first sounded disappointed in comparison with Waits' previous works, further listenings allowed nuances and specific qualities to come out and that the album, through its noir-blues atmosphere and folk narratives, had a "haunting beauty".

It was chosen by the editors of Harp as the best album of 2004.

== Track listing ==
1. "Top of the Hill" – 4:55
2. "Hoist That Rag" – 4:20
3. "Sins of My Father" – 10:36
4. "Shake It" – 3:52
5. "Don't Go into That Barn" – 5:22
6. "How's It Gonna End" – 4:51
7. "Metropolitan Glide" – 4:13
8. "Dead and Lovely" – 5:40
9. "Circus" – 3:56
10. "Trampled Rose" – 3:58
11. "Green Grass" – 3:13
12. "Baby Gonna Leave Me" – 4:29
13. "Clang Boom Steam" – 0:46
14. "Make It Rain" – 3:39
15. "Day After Tomorrow" – 6:56
16. "Chick a Boom" – 1:17 (hidden track)

== Personnel ==
- Tom Waits – vocals, guitar (tracks 3, 6, 7, 11 and 15), chamberlin (track 9), percussion (track 5), shakers (track 12), beatboxing (tracks 1, 7, 12, 13 and 16)
- Brain – percussion (tracks 1–5, 7, 10 and 12), claps (track 4)
- Les Claypool – bass (tracks 2, 4 and 12)
- Harry K. Cody – guitar (tracks 5 and 7), banjo (track 6)
- Mark Howard – bells (track 9), claps (track 4)
- Marc Ribot – guitar (tracks 1–4, 8, 11, 12, 14 and 15), banjo (track 3), cigar box banjo (track 10)
- Larry Taylor – bass (tracks 1, 3, 5–8, 10–12, 14 and 15), guitar (tracks 4 and 5)
- Casey Waits – drums (tracks 8, 9 and 14), turntables (tracks 1 and 7), percussion (tracks 2 and 5), claps (track 4)
- Trisha Wilson – claps (track 4)

== Chart positions ==
Chart (2004)	Peak position
Australian ARIA Albums Chart	27
Austrian Top 40	11
Belgian Albums Chart (Vl)	7
Belgian Albums Chart (Wa)	40
Canadian Albums Chart	11
Danish Albums Chart	5
Dutch Top 100	10
Finnish Albums Chart	23
French SNEP Albums Chart	39
German Albums Chart	19
Irish Albums Chart	9
Italian FIMI Albums Chart	8
Portuguese AFP Albums Chart	8
Swedish Albums Chart	9
Swiss Hitparade Albums Chart	16
UK Albums Chart	16
US Billboard 200	28
US Billboard Independent Albums	1
US Billboard Internet Albums	28

== Certifications ==
Region	Certification	Certified units/sales
United Kingdom (BPI)	Silver	60,000^{‡}
United States	—	202,000
Summaries
Europe	—	250,000
^{‡} Sales+streaming figures based on certification alone.
