= Alice (Tom Waits song) =

Single by Tom Waits

from the album Alice
- Released: 2002
- Recorded: The Pocket Studio, Forestville, CA
- Genre: Jazz
- Length: 4:28
- Label: ANTI-
- Songwriter(s): Kathleen Brennan, Tom Waits
- Producer(s): Kathleen Brennan, Tom Waits

Tom Waits singles chronology
"I Don't Wanna Grow Up" (1992)	"Alice" (2002)	"Bad as Me" (2011)

"Alice" is a song by Tom Waits appearing on his 2002 album Alice.

== Accolades ==
Year	Publication	Country	Accolade	Rank
2002	Rock de Lux	Spain	Songs of the Year	20
2014	Musikexpress	Germany	The 700 Best Songs of All Time	173

(*) designates unordered lists.

== Personnel ==
Adapted from the Alice liner notes.

- Tom Waits – vocals, piano, production

Musicians

- Ara Anderson – muted trumpet
- Eric Perney – bass guitar
- Gino Robair – drums
- Colin Stetson – saxophone

Production and additional personnel

- Kathleen Brennan – production
- Oz Fritz – recording, mixing
- Doug Sax – mastering
- Jeff Sloan – engineering

== Release history ==
Region	Date	Label	Format	Catalog
Netherlands	2002	ANTI-	CD	1070-2
