= Woyzeck (musical) =

2000 musical by Tom Waits, Kathleen Brennan and Robert Wilson

- Music: Tom Waits and Kathleen Brennan
- Lyrics: Tom Waits and Kathleen Brennan
- Book: Robert Wilson (concept); Wolfgang Wiens and Ann-Christin Rommen (text)
- Basis: Woyzeck by Georg Büchner
- Premiere: November 2000: Betty Nansen Teatret, Copenhagen
- Productions: 2000 Betty Nansen Teatret; 2010 Thalia Theater

Woyzeck is a 2000 musical with music and lyrics by Tom Waits and Kathleen Brennan, and a concept by Robert Wilson, based on the unfinished play Woyzeck by German playwright Georg Büchner. It is Waits, Brennan and Wilson's third collaboration, after the 1990 musical The Black Rider and the 1992 musical Alice. Waits recorded many of the songs from Woyzeck for his 2002 album Blood Money, which was released alongside Alice, his recording of songs from the musical Alice.

Woyzeck premiered in November 2000 in a Danish production at the Betty Nansen Teatret in Copenhagen, with dialogue in Danish and songs sung in English; Jens Jørn Spottag played the title role. The Danish production played at the Dublin Theatre Festival in October 2001, then (with the dialogue changed to English) ran at the Barbican Centre in September and October 2002, followed by a run at the Brooklyn Academy of Music in October and November 2002. A 2010 production, which placed all the action on a net suspended over the stage, ran at the Thalia Theater in Hamburg, Germany, then played at Carriageworks in Sydney, Australia. This production added Waits' 1992 song "Dirt in the Ground" to the score. The musical was performed by Shotgun Players in Berkeley, California in 2012.
