= Night on Earth (soundtrack) =

Soundtrack album by Tom Waits
- Released: April 7, 1992
- Genre: Rock
- Length: 52:38
- Label: Island
- Producer: Tom Waits

Tom Waits chronology
Big Time (1988)	Night on Earth (1992)	Bone Machine (1992)

Professional ratings
Review scores
Source	Rating
Allmusic	link
Mojo	3/5 stars

Night on Earth is an album by Tom Waits, released in 1992 on Island Records. It is the soundtrack to the 1991 Jim Jarmusch film of the same name.

Three musicians who performed on this album went on to form the group Oranj Symphonette.

== Track listing ==
All tracks written by Tom Waits, except where noted. Songs arranged by Tom Waits and Francis Thumm. Recorded and mixed by Biff Dawes and assisted by Joe Marquez at Prairie Sun Studios.

No.	Title	Writer(s)	Length
1.	"Back in the Good Old World (Gypsy)"	Waits, Kathleen Brennan	2:30
2.	"Los Angeles Mood (Chromium Descensions)"		2:35
3.	"Los Angeles Theme (Another Private Dick)"		4:28
4.	"New York Theme (Hey, You Can Have That Heart Attack Outside Buddy)"		4:03
5.	"New York Mood (New Haircut and a Busted Lip)"		2:38
6.	"Baby, I'm Not a Baby Anymore (Beatrice Theme)"		1:58
7.	"Good Old World (Waltz Instrumental)"		2:46
8.	"Carnival (Brunello Del Montalcino)"		3:05
9.	"On the Other Side of the World"	Waits, Brennan	5:19
10.	"Good Old World (Gypsy Instrumental)"		2:19
11.	"Paris Mood (Un De Fromage)"		2:38
12.	"Dragging a Dead Priest"		4:00
13.	"Helsinki Mood"		4:10
14.	"Carnival Bob's Confession"		2:17
15.	"Good Old World (Waltz)"	Waits, Brennan	3:56
16.	"On the Other Side of the World (Instrumental)"		3:59

== Personnel ==
- Tom Waits – drums, percussion, piano, pump organ; vocals on "Back in the Good Old World (Gypsy)," "On the Other Side of the World" and "Good Old World (Waltz)"
- Ralph Carney – trumpet, alto saxophone, tenor saxophone, bass clarinet, clarinet, baritone horn, pan pipes
- Josef Brinckmann – accordion
- Matthew Brubeck – cello
- Joe Gore – guitar, banjo
- Clark Suprynowitz – bass
- Francis Thumm – harmonium, Stinson band organ
