= Blood Money (Tom Waits album) =

Studio album by Tom Waits
- Released: May 7, 2002
- Genres: Jazz; cabaret
- Length: 42:11
- Label: Anti
- Producers: Kathleen Brennan; Tom Waits

Tom Waits chronology
Alice (2002)	Blood Money (2002)	Real Gone (2004)

Blood Money is the fifteenth studio album by Tom Waits, released in 2002 on the ANTI- label. It consists of songs Waits and Kathleen Brennan wrote for Robert Wilson's opera Woyzeck. Waits had worked with Wilson on two previous plays: The Black Rider and Alice. Alice was released with Blood Money simultaneously in 2002.

== Background ==
The album contains most of the songs written by Waits and Brennan for Wilson's production of Woyzeck (2000). Wilson's opera was based on the play of the same name by Georg Büchner, which had also inspired Alban Berg's opera Wozzeck. Wilson's Woyzeck premiered at the Betty Nansen Theatre in Copenhagen in November 2000. Asked about releasing two albums at the same time, Waits said "Well, thing is, people get upset when you haven't had a record out in seven years--then they get upset when you put out two at the same time. It's like, 'Where are my eggs?' then 'I didn't order this!' My feeling is that if it turns out to be a success, then it was my idea, and if it's not, then I blame it on someone else." The score is the same as Wilson's play, but Waits explains "I just changed the title. I didn't think anybody would know who Woyzeck is."

According to Dan Cohen,

"Nineteenth-century German poet Georg Buchner's story Woyzeck, about a soldier driven mad by bizarre army experiments and infidelity, incurs music Waits calls 'flesh and blood, earthbound; carnal ... Tin Pan Alley meets the Weimar Republic.' Like all Waits' efforts since Swordfishtrombones ('83), it's stylistically varied, with an overall production 'patina'--in this case a dry, raspy shibui (the Japanese word for dilapidation) sound personified by the pod (a 4-foot-long Indonesian bean shaker), marimbas and a 57-whistle pneumatic calliope that reverberated for five miles in the Sonoma shack where the CDs were recorded."

Waits said of the calliope, "playing a calliope is an experience. There's an old expression, 'Never let your daughter marry a calliope player.' Because they're all out of their minds. Because the calliope is so flaming loud. Louder than a bagpipe. In the old days, they used them to announce the arrival of the circus because you could literally hear it three miles away. Imagine something you could hear three miles away, and now you're right in front of it, in a studio...playing it like a piano, and your face is red, your hair is sticking up, you're sweating. You could scream and nobody could hear you. It's probably the most visceral music experience I've ever had. And when you're done, you feel like you should probably should go to the doctor. Just check me over, Doc, I did a couple of numbers on the calliope and I want you to take me through the paces."

The song "Shiny Things" appears in Wilson's Wozzeck but not on Blood Money; it was later released on Waits's Orphans: Brawlers, Bawlers & Bastards (2006).

== Reception ==
Professional ratings
Aggregate scores
Source	Rating
Metacritic	84/100
Review scores
Source	Rating
AllMusic	4/5 stars
Robert Christgau	A−
Entertainment Weekly	B+
The Guardian	4/5 stars
Los Angeles Times	4/4 stars
NME	7/10
Pitchfork	9.0/10
Q	4/5 stars
Rolling Stone	3.5/5 stars
Spin	7/10

Maddy Costa writes of Alice and Blood Money: "Bearing in mind that both albums were recorded in the same sessions, share the same musicians and use much the same instrumentation, the similarities are hardly surprising. Looking back, it is clear that Waits was peculiarly suited to both projects. His songs have long been preoccupied with society's outsiders, with murder and desire... the best songs on Blood Money merrily rework the skewed rhythms and whirling textures that are Waits's trademark...Waits and Brennan dive into the corrupt, merciless world of Woyzeck with relish; their lyrics are perkily savage, cheerfully nihilistic. 'I'd sell your heart to the junkman baby, for a buck,' snipes 'God's Away on Business', while 'Starving in the Belly of a Whale' warns: 'If you live in hope you're dancing to a terrible tune.' Best of all is 'Misery Is the River of the World', a sinister twist of marimba and blurting bass clarinet, wheezes from an ancient calliope and bubbles of percussion from an Indonesian pod, over which Waits gleefully puffs: 'Misery's the river of the world - everybody row!'"

Cohen writes that "This skeletal army of instruments tends to overshadow the vocals on the edgy tracks (more restrained than on Bone Machine), but the potent 'Knife Chase' (a Peter Gunnish instrumental featuring Waits' son Casey on drums) is a standout. The bluesy 'Another Man's Vine,' the ballad 'Lullaby' and the extraordinary 'The Part You Throw Away' that's like the pizzicato string backing in James Brown's 'It's a Man's World' set in the Ukraine, are my other picks."

Robert Christgau praised Blood Money, writing "Waits has the bases covered. He's a genius; when he doesn't make masterpieces, he comes close." He preferred it to Alice, calling Blood Money "a more consistent record, albeit unbalanced by arbitrary thematic commitments. 'Lullaby' goes someplace new with its quiet 'If I die before you wake/Don't you cry; don't you weep,' and the perfidy-of-woman fable 'Another Man's Vine' approaches tragedy by rejecting contempt. But rather than building off each other, the four life-sucks songs, only 'Everything Goes to Hell' less than inspired, protest too much... Maybe the reason his bandleading stands out so is that, for all his joy in language, it best articulates his deepest compulsion, which is to reject a corrupt present without wallowing in a romanticized past. He forges into the future on old instruments nobody's ever heard of because they were rejects, just like the losers and monsters whose stories he tells. This is honorable, difficult work."

Elizabeth Gilbert wrote of the two albums: "The good people at Waits's label, Anti, struck a bit of genius when they decided to release these two albums simultaneously. Because the contrasts of Alice and Blood Money perfectly highlight the two aspects of Waits's musical character that have been colliding in his work for decades. On one hand, the man has an unmatched instinct for melody. Nobody can write a more heartbreaking ballad than Waits. On the other hand, he has shown a lifelong desire to unbuckle those pretty melodies... here, on Alice and Blood Money, you can see it all together, side-by-side. All that Tom Waits is capable of. All the beauty and all the perversity. All the talent and all the discord. All that he wants to honor and all that he wants to dismantle. All of it gorgeous, all of it transporting."

The album ranked at #18 in Metacritic's Top 30 albums of 2002. As of 2003, Blood Money has sold 143,000 copies in the US, according to Nielsen Soundscan.

The song "God's Away on Business" was featured in Enron: The Smartest Guys in the Room (2005). "All the World is Green" was featured in The Secret Life of Words (2005) and The Diving Bell and the Butterfly' (2007). "Misery is the River of the World" was featured in The X-Files episode "Babylon", which aired on February 16, 2016. "Starving in the Belly of a Whale" was featured in Buster's Mal Heart (2016) as the opening song.

== Track listing ==
All tracks written by Tom Waits and Kathleen Brennan.

No.	Title	Length
1.	"Misery Is the River of the World"	4:25
2.	"Everything Goes to Hell"	3:45
3.	"Coney Island Baby"	4:02
4.	"All the World Is Green"	4:36
5.	"God's Away on Business"	2:59
6.	"Another Man's Vine"	2:28
7.	"Knife Chase"	2:26
8.	"Lullaby"	2:09
9.	"Starving in the Belly of a Whale"	3:41
10.	"The Part You Throw Away"	4:22
11.	"Woe"	1:20
12.	"Calliope"	1:59
13.	"A Good Man Is Hard to Find"	3:57

== Personnel ==
- Tom Waits – vocals (tracks 1–13), piano (tracks 1, 3, 6, 7, 9, 11), calliope (tracks 1, 12, 13), Chamberlin (tracks 2, 3, 9), acoustic guitar (2, 4, 8, 10), electric guitar (tracks 5 and 9), toy piano (track 12), pump organ (track 13)
- Larry Taylor – bass (tracks 1, 3–7, 9), electric guitar (track 7), acoustic guitar (track 13)
- Bebe Risenfors – bass clarinet (track 1, 7), accordion (track 2), saxophone (track 7), clarinet (13)
- Gino Robair – marimba, bells and gongs (track 1), bongos and timpani (track 2), floor toms (track 9)
- Mules Patterson – pod (track 1)
- Matthew Sperry – bass (track 2)
- Colin Stetson – baritone saxophone (track 2), saxophone (tracks 3 and 7), clarinet (tracks 4 and 10), bass clarinet (tracks 5 and 9), baritone horn, tenor & alto saxophone (track 6)
- Dan Plonsey – clarinet (track 2)
- Matt Brubeck – cello (tracks 3, 4, 8–11), bass (track 13)
- Ara Anderson – trumpet (tracks 3, 7, 13)
- Bent Clausen – marimba (track 4), pod (track 5), bass drums (track 7)
- Stewart Copeland – drum set and log drums (track 5)
- Joe Gore – electric guitar (track 5)
- Nik Phelps – trumpet (tracks 5 and 12), baby tuba (track 5)
- Charlie Musselwhite – harmonica (tracks 5 and 9)
- Andrew Borger – marimba (tracks 6 and 13)
- Myles Boisen – guitar (track 7)
- Casey Waits – drums (track 7)
- Dawn Harms – stroh violin (tracks 8, 11, 13), violin (8–11)

== Charts ==
=== Weekly charts ===
Weekly chart performance for Blood Money
Chart (2002)	Peak position
Australian ARIA Albums Chart	25
Austrian Top 40	5
Belgian Albums Chart (Vl)	8
Belgian Albums Chart (Wa)	33
Danish Albums Chart	2
Dutch Top 100	21
Finnish Albums Chart	35
French SNEP Albums Chart	36
German Albums Chart	9
Irish Albums Chart	4
Italian FIMI Albums Chart	6
Norwegian Albums Chart	4
Swedish Albums Chart	12
Swiss Hitparade Albums Chart	25
UK Albums Chart	21
US Billboard 200	32
US Billboard Independent Albums	2
US Billboard Internet Albums	32

=== Year-end charts ===
2002 year-end chart performance for Blood Money
Chart (2002)	Position
Canadian Alternative Albums (Nielsen SoundScan)	131

== Certifications ==
Certifications for Blood Money
Region	Certification	Certified units/sales
Netherlands (NVPI)	Gold	40,000^{^}
^{^} Shipments figures based on certification alone.
