= Big Time (Tom Waits album) =

Live album by Tom Waits
- Released: September 1988
- Recorded: November 5 and November 9, 1987
- Venues: The Warfield, San Francisco, and Wiltern Theatre, Los Angeles
- Genres: Blues rock; experimental rock
- Length: 64:15
- Label: Island
- Producers: Chris Blackwell; Kathleen Brennan; Tom Waits

Tom Waits chronology
Franks Wild Years (1987)	Big Time (1988)	Night on Earth (1992)

Tom Waits live chronology
Big Time (1988)	Romeo Bleeding: Live from Austin (2009)

Singles from Big Time
- 1. "16 Shells From a Thirty-Ought-Six" Released: 1988

Professional ratings
Review scores
Source	Rating
AllMusic	link
Mojo	3/5 stars
Robert Christgau	B link

Big Time is the first conventional live album by American musician Tom Waits, featuring performances from two shows on Waits' 1987 tour. The album was released less than a year later on Island Records. While Big Time was the first released recording of public concert performances by Waits, it was not strictly his first live release: his 1975 Nighthawks at the Diner was a live performance before an audience that was conducted entirely within a recording studio.

== Background and production ==
In efforts to promote Franks Wild Years, Waits began a historic tour of North America and Europe in October 1987. The tour incorporated a theatrical aspect, as Franks Wild Years was based on a play written by Waits about his then-alter-ego, Frank O'Brien, who debuted on the track "Frank's Wild Years" on Swordfishtrombones. Waits described O'Brien as:

"Quite a guy. Grew up in a bird's eye frozen, oven-ready, rural American town where Bing, Bob, Dean, Wayne & Jerry are considered major constellations. Frank, mistakenly, thinks he can stuff himself into their shorts and present himself to an adoring world. He is a combination of Will Rogers and Mark Twain, playing accordion—but without the wisdom they possessed. He has a poet's heart and a boy's sense of wonder with the world. A legend in Rainville since he burned his house down and took off for the Big Time."

The theatrical play, which premiered on June 17, 1986 at Chicago's Briar Street Theatre, ran for two months and received "mixed reviews".

Five of the final shows in North America were held at San Francisco's Warfield Theatre and Los Angeles' Wiltern Theatre in November 1987, shortly before Waits and his band left for Europe. Waits and his wife Kathleen Brennan then proposed the idea of releasing the recorded live footage as a concert film. Originally titled Crooked Time, Brennan played a large role in the development and eventual production of the idea.

During post-production of both the album and movie, Waits' voice was lowered in tone, apparently as both he and the producers wanted to "give more power to the songs." Several audio effects – such as the stamping of boots, finger snapping, maracas, gunshots, train whistles, traffic noise, laughter and applause – were also added in post-production. Additional footage from European performances in Dublin, Stockholm and Berlin was also added.

== Track listing ==
All tracks written by Tom Waits, except where noted.

No.	Title	Writer(s)	Length
1.	"16 Shells From a Thirty-Ought-Six"		4:18
2.	"Red Shoes"		4:19
3.	"Underground*"		2:34
4.	"Cold Cold Ground"		3:27
5.	"Straight to the Top*"	Waits, Greg Cohen	2:48
6.	"Yesterday Is Here*"	Waits, Kathleen Brennan	2:40
7.	"Way Down in the Hole"		4:43
8.	"Falling Down" (Studio)		4:15
9.	"Strange Weather"	Waits, Brennan	3:35
10.	"Big Black Mariah"		2:59
11.	"Rain Dogs"		3:36
12.	"Train Song"		4:29
13.	"Johnsburg, Illinois*"		1:29
14.	"Ruby's Arms*"		4:54
15.	"Telephone Call From Istanbul"		4:17
16.	"Clap Hands*"		4:57
17.	"Gun Street Girl"		4:01
18.	"Time"		4:10

Tracks marked (*) on CD and cassette only; omitted from LP.

Songs from the movie not on the released soundtrack:

No.	Title	Length
1.	"9th & Hennepin"
2.	"Frank's Wild Years"
3.	"Hang on St. Christopher"
4.	"I'll Take New York"
5.	"Innocent When You Dream"
6.	"More Than Rain"
7.	"Shore Leave"

== Personnel ==
=== Musicians and performers ===
- Tom Waits – lead vocals, piano, guitar (on "Cold Cold Ground" and "Strange Weather"), organ (on "Falling Down"), percussion (on "16 Shells From a Thirty-Ought-Six")
- Marc Ribot – lead guitar, banjo, trumpet
- Fred Tackett – guitar (on "Falling Down")
- Greg Cohen – electric bass, basstarda, alto horn
- Larry Taylor – double bass (on "Falling Down")
- Ralph Carney – saxophone, clarinets, baritone horn
- Willy Schwarz – accordion, hammond organ, sitar, conga
- Michael Blair – drums, percussion, bongos, brake drum
- Richie Hayward – drums (on "Falling Down")

=== Production ===
- Tom Waits – producer
- Kathleen Brennan – producer
- Catharins Masters – additional production
- Biff Dawes – engineer, mixer
