= Way Down in the Hole =

Song by Tom Waits

from the album Franks Wild Years
- Length: 3:30
- Songwriter(s): Tom Waits

"Way Down in the Hole" is a song written by the singer-songwriter Tom Waits. It was included on his 1987 album Franks Wild Years, which was first presented as a stage production put on by the Steppenwolf Theatre Company in Chicago, Illinois.

The song was used as the theme for HBO's The Wire. A different recording was used each season. Versions, in series order, were recorded by The Blind Boys of Alabama, Tom Waits, The Neville Brothers, DoMaJe, and Steve Earle. Season four's version, performed by the Baltimore teenagers Ivan Ashford, Markel Steele, Cameron Brown, Tariq Al-Sabir and Avery Bargasse, was arranged and recorded specifically for the show. An extended version of the Blind Boys of Alabama recording was played over a montage in the series finale.

In 2004, music historian Kim Beissel said that the 1994 song "Red Right Hand" by Nick Cave and the Bad Seeds was loosely based on "Way Down in the Hole".

== Cover version ==
- Sharon Robinson in EP 1 (songs by Waits, Redding, Hornsby, Clapton), 2015.
