= Jack Kerouac Reads On the Road =

Compilation album by Jack Kerouac
- Released: September 14, 1999
- Genres: Jazz, beat poetry, spoken word
- Length: 74:38
- Label: Rykodisc
- Producers: Lee Ranaldo, Jim Sampas

Jack Kerouac chronology
The Jack Kerouac Collection (1990)	Jack Kerouac Reads On the Road (1999)

Jack Kerouac Reads On the Road is a compilation album by American novelist and poet Jack Kerouac, released posthumously on September 14, 1999. The centrepiece of the record is a 28-minute recitation by Kerouac from his book On the Road that was recorded on an acetate disc in the 1950s but thought lost for decades, and had only recently been rediscovered at the time of release. Other tracks feature Kerouac singing renditions of Jazz hits from the 1920s, 1930s and 1940s alongside songs and poems of his own composition.

The album closes with a cover of Kerouac's track "On the Road" (itself included earlier on the disc) performed by Tom Waits with Primus. Video footage of the recording of this track can be seen on the Primus release Videoplasty, and the track itself was later included on the Tom Waits collection Orphans: Brawlers, Bawlers & Bastards, along with a version of the same song titled "Home I'll Never Be".

== Track listing ==
No.	Title	Writer(s)	Length
1.	"Ain't We Got Fun?"	Fio Rito, Kahn, Russo, Whiting	2:34
2.	"On the Road (Jazz of the Beat Generation)"	Kerouac	28.45
3.	"On the Road"	Kerouac	2:18
4.	"Come Rain or Come Shine"	Arlen, Mercer	3:42
5.	"Orizaba 210 Blues"	Amram, Kerouac	9:34
6.	"When a Woman Loves a Man"	Hanighen, Jenkins, Mercer	2:57
7.	"Leavin' Town"	Handy, Segal	3:04
8.	"Washington D.C. Blues"	Amram, Kerouac	17:46
9.	"On the Road" (performed by Tom Waits and Primus)	Kerouac, Waits	3:58
Total length:			74:38

== Critical reception ==
Professional ratings
Review scores
Source	Rating
Allmusic	4.5/5 stars

Richie Unterberger, in his review for Allmusic, describes the album as "a worthy collection of Jack Kerouac's narratives and poetry", noting that it is particularly enjoyable to hear Kerouac recite his work "since his prose had much of a jazz rhythm, and since he was an engaging reader/performer himself." Unterberger goes on to say that Kerouac's singing is "unexpected, and amusing if not brilliant".

== Personnel ==
Musicians

- Jack Kerouac - Vocals
- Andreu Johnny Almendra - Bongos, Drums
- David Amram - Percussion, Piano, French Horn
- Candido Camero - Conga
- Ralph Carney - Saxophone
- Les Claypool - Bass, Percussion
- Vic Juris - Guitar
- Larry LaLonde - Guitar, Percussion
- Bryan "Brain" Mantia - Percussion
- John Medeski - Organ
- Midhat Serbagi - Viola
- Jane Taylor - Bassoon
- Victor Venegas - Bass
- Tom Waits - Vocals, Guitar, Percussion

Other personnel

- Douglas Brinkley - Liner Notes
- Bernd Burgdorf - Engineer, Mixing
- Greg Calbi - Mastering, Digital Transfers
- Biff Dawes - Engineer
- Steve Fallone - Mastering, Digital Transfers
- Robert Frank - Photography
- David Greenberg - Photography
- Jimmy Harned - Assistant Engineer
- Dan Lawrence - Engineer, Mixing
- Jerry Newman - Engineer, Mixing
- Frank Olinsky - Art Direction, Design
- Lee Ranaldo - Producer, Digital Editing
- Jim Sampas - Producer, Engineer, Digital Transfers
- Sean Slade - Digital Transfers
- Jeff Sloan - Engineer
- Michael Stipe - Photography
