= Alice (Tom Waits album) =

14th studio album

Studio album / soundtrack by Tom Waits
- Released: May 7, 2002
- Studio: In The Pocket, Forestville, California
- Genre: Jazz; chamber music
- Length: 48:23
- Label: Anti-
- Producer: Kathleen Brennan, Tom Waits

Tom Waits chronology
Mule Variations (1999)	Alice (2002)	Blood Money (2002)

Singles from Alice
- 1. "Alice" Released: 2002

Alice is the fourteenth studio album by Tom Waits, released in 2002 on Epitaph Records (under the Anti- sub-label). It consists of songs written by Waits and Kathleen Brennan for the opera Alice ten years earlier. The opera was a collaboration with Robert Wilson, with whom Waits had previously worked on The Black Rider. Waits and Wilson collaborated again on Woyzeck; the songs from it were recorded and released on Blood Money at the same time as Alice.

== Background ==
The album contains most of the songs written for Alice, directed by Wilson at the Thalia Theatre in Hamburg in 1992. Alice is about Lewis Carroll's obsession with Alice Liddell, the inspiration for Alice's Adventures in Wonderland (1865) and Through the Looking-Glass (1871). The play has since been performed in various theatres around the world. The songs had been released as a bootleg in several different versions called The Alice Demos many years before its official release. The source is believed to be studio recordings taken when Waits' car was broken into in late 1992.

In 2002, Alice was co-released with Blood Money, an album containing songs Waits wrote for Wilson's musical Woyzeck (2000). Asked why he released Alice and Blood Money together, Waits explained: "we believe in the tunes...if you're gonna heat up the stove, there's no point in making just one pancake, right?" Waits described the songs on Alice as "adult songs for children, or children's songs for adults. It's a maelstrom or fever-dream, a tone poem, with torch songs and waltzes...an odyssey in dream logic and nonsense."

The songs draw on Waits' interest in circus performers; "Poor Edward" is about Edward Mordake and "Table Top Joe" is about Johnny Eck. The lyrics reference the Alice books; "We're All Mad Here" is a line spoken to Alice by the Cheshire Cat. Like many of Waits's albums since Swordfishtrombones, Alice has eclectic orchestration. Here he makes use of the Stroh violin, a violin with a horn attached to the bridge. Of the Stroh, Waits says: "they're no longer as popular as they were, but they were essential and there were probably fist fights in the orchestra pit before the Stroh. Cause now a lot of people consider 'em obsolete but hey, when I see the word obsolete I get in line."

The song "Altar Boy" appears in Wilson's Alice but not on Alice; it was later released on Waits's Orphans: Brawlers, Bawlers & Bastards (2006).

== Reception ==
Professional ratings
Aggregate scores
Source	Rating
Metacritic	90/100
Review scores
Source	Rating
AllMusic	4/5 stars
Entertainment Weekly	B+
The Guardian	3/5 stars
Los Angeles Times	4/4 stars
NME	8/10
Pitchfork	9.0/10
Q	4/5 stars
Rolling Stone	4/5 stars
Spin	7/10
Uncut	5/5 stars

Maddy Costa writes: "what Alice and Blood Money also highlight is the consistency of Waits's songwriting, and the extent to which Kathleen Brennan, his wife and co-writer of every song here, shares his vision. Through all the experiments that began with 1983's Swordfishtrombones, Waits has maintained a distinct musical voice, an idiosyncratic way of yoking sounds together. Alice's mournful ballads all seem to be haunted by ghosts of albums past...he and Brennan share with Lewis Carroll a linguistic playfulness, a delight in choppy syntax and warped juxtapositions. The first lines of Alice's title track set the tone: 'It's dreamy weather we're on/ You wave your crooked wand/ Along an icy pond/ With a frozen moon/ A murder of silhouette crows.' From there on the lyrics get curiouser and curiouser."

Alice was ranked #2 in Metacritic's Top 30 albums of 2002. In 2006 it was awarded a diamond certification from the Independent Music Companies Association, which indicated sales of at least 250,000 copies throughout Europe. As of 2003, Alice has sold 140,000 copies in the U.S., according to Nielsen Soundscan.

== Track listing ==
All tracks written by Tom Waits and Kathleen Brennan.

No.	Title	Length
1.	"Alice"	4:28
2.	"Everything You Can Think"	3:10
3.	"Flower's Grave"	3:28
4.	"No One Knows I'm Gone"	1:42
5.	"Kommienezuspadt"	3:10
6.	"Poor Edward"	3:42
7.	"Table Top Joe"	4:14
8.	"Lost in the Harbour"	3:45
9.	"We're All Mad Here"	2:31
10.	"Watch Her Disappear"	2:33
11.	"Reeperbahn"	4:02
12.	"I'm Still Here"	1:49
13.	"Fish & Bird"	3:59
14.	"Barcarolle"	3:59
15.	"Fawn"	1:43

== Personnel ==
Adapted from the album liner notes.

Musicians

- Tim Allen – scraper (5)
- Ara Anderson – trumpet (1, 13), horns (11, 13)
- Myles Boisen – banjo (11)
- Andrew Borger – oil drums (5), frame drum (5), percussion (5)
- Matt Brubeck – cello (2–6, 8, 10, 12, 13), bass (14)
- Bent Clausen – Swiss hand bells (2), piano (7), piano solo (14)
- Stewart Copeland – trap kit (7)
- Joe Gore – electric guitar (7)
- Dawn Harms – violin (3, 4, 10, 12–14), Stroh violin (4, 6, 8, 13)
- Carla Kihlstedt – violin (8, 9, 11, 15)
- Eric Perney – bass (1)
- Nik Phelps – French horn (2), trumpet (2)
- Bebe Risenfors – Stroh violin (2), viola (3, 4, 6), clarinet (3, 5, 13), Baby Bass (5, 7), marimba (5), percussion (5), fiddle (8)
- Gino Robair – drums (1), percussion (9, 11), marimba (15)
- Matthew Sperry – bass (9, 11, 14, 15)
- Colin Stetson – saxophone (1, 5, 14), clarinet (9, 11, 12, 15)
- Larry Taylor – bass (2–8, 13), electric guitar (2), acoustic guitar (5, 7), percussion (5)
- Tom Waits – vocals, piano (1, 3, 6, 9, 11–15), Mellotron (2), Chamberlin vibraphone (2, 14), pod shaker (2, 5), pump organ (3, 4, 7, 8, 10, 13), stomp (5), circular violin (9), Chamberlin (11), toy glockenspiel (13), cymbal (14)

Technical

- Jeff Abarta – art direction
- Gerd Bessler – engineer (8)
- Kathleen Brennan – producer
- Richard Fisher – studio support
- Oz Fritz – engineer (1–11, 13, 15), mixing
- Jacquire King – engineer (12, 14), mixing (3, 8)
- Matt Mahurin – photography, concept
- Ralfinoe – design
- Doug Sax – mastering
- Jeff Sloan – second engineer
- Tom Waits – producer

== Charts ==
=== Weekly charts ===
Weekly chart performance for Alice
Chart (2002)	Peak position
Australian Albums (ARIA)	26
Austrian Albums (Ö3 Austria)	3
Belgian Albums (Ultratop Flanders)	7
Danish Albums (Hitlisten)	3
Dutch Albums (Album Top 100)	16
New Zealand Albums (RMNZ)	48
Finnish Albums (Suomen virallinen lista)	27
French Albums (SNEP)	27
German Albums (Offizielle Top 100)	10
Italian Albums (FIMI)	5
Norwegian Albums (VG-lista)	3
Swedish Albums (Sverigetopplistan)	13
Swiss Albums (Schweizer Hitparade)	24
UK Albums (OCC)	20
US Billboard 200	33

=== Year-end charts ===
2002 year-end chart performance for Alice
Chart (2002)	Position
Canadian Alternative Albums (Nielsen SoundScan)	130

== Certifications and sales ==
Certifications for Alice
Region	Certification	Certified units/sales
Netherlands (NVPI)	Gold	40,000^{^}
United States	—	140,000
Summaries
Europe	—	250,000
^{^} Shipments figures based on certification alone.
