= Franks Wild Years =

Studio album by Tom Waits
- Released: August 17, 1987
- Recorded: Universal, Chicago; The Sound Factory, Hollywood; Sunset Sound, Hollywood
- Length: 55:34
- Label: Island
- Producer: Tom Waits

Tom Waits chronology
Rain Dogs (1985)	Franks Wild Years (1987)	Big Time (1988)

Singles from Franks Wild Years
- 1. "Hang On St. Christopher" Released: August 17, 1987

Professional ratings
Review scores
Source	Rating
AllMusic	4/5 stars
Encyclopedia of Popular Music	4/5 stars
Los Angeles Times	2.5/4 stars
Mojo	3/5 stars
Q	4/5 stars
The Rolling Stone Album Guide	3/5 stars
Uncut	4/5 stars
The Village Voice	B

Franks Wild Years is the tenth studio album by Tom Waits, released 1987 on Island Records. It is the third in a loose trilogy that began with Swordfishtrombones. Subtitled "Un Operachi Romantico in Two Acts", the album contains songs written by Waits and collaborators (mainly his wife, Kathleen Brennan) for a play of the same name. The play had its world premiere at the Briar St. Theatre in Chicago, Illinois, on June 22, 1986, performed by the Steppenwolf Theatre Company. "If I Have to Go" was used in the play, but released only in 2006 on Orphans: Brawlers, Bawlers & Bastards. The theme from "If I Have to Go" was used under the title "Rat's Theme" in the documentary Streetwise as early as 1984. The title is derived from "Frank's Wild Years", a track from Swordfishtrombones.

== Background ==
Per Steve Hochman,

"This rags-to-rags tale completes the trilogy that began with 1983's Swordfishtrombones (featuring the song 'Frank's Wild Years,' in which the protagonist torches his suburban SoCal house and heads north on the Hollywood Freeway). Then came 1985's Rain Dogs, which mixed Brecht-Weill drama with Captain Beefheart bizarreness for an effect that conjured up a Saturday-night fish fry in the freak show of a decrepit circus... The story basically follows Frank on a hazy, ill-fated Orphic journey 'Straight to the Top (Vegas)' (as one song is titled) through 'Temptation,' 'Way Down in the Hole' and, finally, out on the 'Cold Cold Ground.' At the road's end lies 'Innocent When You Dream (78),' a moral that is told to Frank early on but doesn't hit home until the end, when it is heard in a lovely, tinnily nostalgic rendition.

== Critical reception ==
The album ranked number 5 among "Albums of the Year" for 1987 in the annual NME critics' poll.

AllMusic notes the "spare, stripped-down arrangements consisting of instruments like marimba, baritone horn, and pump organ and singing in a strained voice that has been artificially compressed and distorted. The songs themselves often are conventional romantic vignettes, or would be minus the oddities of instrumentation, arrangement, and performance. For example, 'Innocent When You Dream,' a song of disappointment in love and friendship, has a winning melody, but it is played in a seesaw arrangement of pump organ, bass, violin, and piano, and Waits sings it like an enraged drunk. (He points out the arbitrary nature of the arrangements by repeating 'Straight to the Top,' done as a demented rhumba in act one, as a Vegas-style Frank Sinatra swing tune in act two.)

Elvis Costello included Franks Wild Years on his list of essential albums, highlighting "Hang On St. Christopher" and "Innocent When You Dream".

== Influence ==
Various versions of "Way Down in the Hole" were used as the theme music for the HBO series The Wire, including Waits' original version for the second season. "Temptation" and "Cold Cold Ground" were used in Jean-Claude Lauzon's Léolo (1992). "Cold Cold Ground" was also used in the series Homicide: Life on the Street. "Temptation" and "Straight to the Top (Vegas)" featured in Enron: The Smartest Guys in the Room (2005), and "Innocent When You Dream" featured in Smoke (1995). "Yesterday Is Here" appears in "The Night Shift", the second episode of Poker Face.

Jim Sclavunos recalls that

"For the better part of a year after its release, Franks Wild Years was the nightly go-to-pump-up album for me and my roommate. Gussying ourselves up to war-song strains of 'Temptation', 'Straight to the Top' etc was an essential part of our ritual of getting ourselves 'in the mood' before emerging from the squalor of our Lower East Side tenement, ready to take on the world."

Diana Krall covered "Temptation" on her 2004 album The Girl in the Other Room. Her version was also released as a CD single.

== Track listing ==
All tracks are written by Tom Waits, except where noted.

Side one
No.	Title	Writer(s)	Length
1.	"Hang On St. Christopher"		2:46
2.	"Straight to the Top (Rhumba)"	Waits, Greg Cohen	2:30
3.	"Blow Wind Blow"		3:35
4.	"Temptation"		3:53
5.	"Innocent When You Dream (Barroom)"		4:15
6.	"I'll Be Gone"	Waits, Kathleen Brennan	3:12
7.	"Yesterday Is Here"	Waits, Brennan	2:29
8.	"Please Wake Me Up"	Waits, Brennan	3:36
9.	"Franks Theme"		1:49

Side two
No.	Title	Writer(s)	Length
1.	"More Than Rain"		3:52
2.	"Way Down in the Hole"		3:30
3.	"Straight to the Top (Vegas)"	Waits, Cohen	3:26
4.	"I'll Take New York"		3:58
5.	"Telephone Call from Istanbul"		3:12
6.	"Cold Cold Ground"		4:07
7.	"Train Song"		3:20
8.	"Innocent When You Dream (78)"		3:08

Note: "Cold Cold Ground" is incorrectly listed as "Cold Call Ground" on the Island CD release.

== Personnel ==
Credits adapted from the album liner notes.

Musicians

- Jay Anderson – bass (8)
- Michael Blair – drums, conga, percussion, maracas, marimba, orchestra bells, glockenspiel (1–4, 6, 10–14)
- Kathleen Brennan – vocal arrangements (4)
- Angela Brown – background vocals (11)
- Ralph Carney – saxophone, baritone horn, violin, tenor saxophone (1–2, 4–6, 8, 10–13, 17)
- Greg Cohen – bass, alto horn, horn arrangements, Leslie bass pedals (1–6, 10–14, 16–17)
- David Hidalgo – accordion (15–16)
- Leslie Holland – background vocals (11)
- Lynne Jordan – background vocals (11)
- Marc Ribot – guitar, banjo (1, 4, 11, 14)
- William Schimmel – piano, pump organ, accordion, Leslie bass pedals, cocktail piano (1, 2, 5–6, 10, 12–13, 17)
- Larry Taylor – bass, upright bass (2, 7, 8, 15)
- Moris Tepper – guitar (4, 6, 10, 14)
- Francis Thumm – prepared piano, pump organ (3, 10)
- Tom Waits – vocals (all tracks), pump organ (3, 5, 9, 16), Optigan (2, 4, 8, 10), guitar (4, 7, 15), vocal stylings (12), rooster (6), piano (16), Farfisa (14), Mellotron (8), drums (14), conga (2), tambourine (7)

Technical

- Tchad Blake – additional engineer
- Biff Dawes – engineer, mixing (at Sunset Sound, Hollywood, California)
- Lorita Delacerna – additional engineer
- David Glover – additional engineer
- Bill Higley – additional engineer
- Mike Kloster – additional engineer
- David Knight – additional engineer
- Danny Leake – engineer
- Jean-Baptiste Mondino – conception, photography
- Jeff Price – art direction
- Stephen Shelton – additional engineer
- Tom Waits – producer
- Howie Weinberg – mastering

== Charts ==
Chart (1987)	Peak position
Australia (Kent Music Report)	83
Austrian Albums (Ö3 Austria)	24
Canada Top Albums/CDs (RPM)	35
Dutch Albums (Album Top 100)	21
German Albums (Offizielle Top 100)	49
New Zealand Albums (RMNZ)	42
Norwegian Albums (VG-lista)	13
Swedish Albums (Sverigetopplistan)	17
Swiss Albums (Schweizer Hitparade)	14
US Billboard 200	115

== Certifications ==
Region	Certification	Certified units/sales
Canada (Music Canada)	Gold	50,000^{^}
^{^} Shipments figures based on certification alone.
