= Bone Machine =

Studio album by Tom Waits
- Released: September 8, 1992
- Recorded: Prairie Sun, Cotati
- Genres: Experimental rock; lo-fi; avant-garde; blues; blues rock
- Length: 53:30
- Label: Island
- Producers: Tom Waits; Kathleen Brennan (associate)

Tom Waits chronology
Night on Earth (1992)	Bone Machine (1992)	The Black Rider (1993)

Singles from Bone Machine
- 1. "Goin' Out West" Released: 1992

Bone Machine is the eleventh studio album by American singer and musician Tom Waits, released by Island Records on September 8, 1992. It won a Grammy Award for Best Alternative Music Album and features guest appearances by David Hidalgo, Les Claypool, Brain, and Keith Richards. The album marked Waits' return to studio albums, coming five years after Franks Wild Years (1987).

Recorded in a room in the cellar area of Prairie Sun Recording studios, described by Waits as "just a cement floor and a hot water heater", the album is often noted for its rough, stripped-down, percussion-heavy style, as well as its dark lyrical themes revolving around death and decay. The album cover—a blurry, black-and-white, close-up image of Waits screaming while wearing a horned skullcap and protective goggles—was taken by filmmaker Jesse Dylan, son of Bob Dylan. The photo is taken from a freeze frame of the Dylan and Jim Jarmusch directed video for "Goin' Out West". They also directed a video for "I Don't Wanna Grow Up".

== Recording and production ==
Bone Machine was recorded and produced entirely at Prairie Sun Recording Studios in Cotati, California, in a room of Studio C known as "the Waits Room", located in the old cement hatchery rooms of the cellar of the buildings. Prairie Sun's studio head Mark "Mooka" Rennick said, "[Waits] gravitated toward these 'echo' rooms and created the Bone Machine aural landscape. [...] What we like about Tom is that he is a musicologist. And he has a tremendous ear. His talent is a national treasure."

Waits said of the bare-bones studio, "I found a great room to work in, it's just a cement floor and a hot water heater. Okay, we'll do it here. It's got some good echo." References to the recording environment and process were made in the field-recorded interview segments made for the promotional CD release, Bone Machine: The Operator's Manual, which threaded together full studio tracks and conversation for a pre-recorded radio show format.

Bone Machine was the first Waits album on which he played drums and percussion extensively. In 1992, Waits stated: "I like to play drums when I'm angry. At home I have a metal instrument called a conundrum with a lot of things hanging off it that I've found - metal objects - and I like playing it with a hammer. I love it. Drumming is therapeutic. I wish I'd found it when I was younger."

== Critical reception ==
Professional ratings
Review scores
Source	Rating
AllMusic	4.5/5 stars
Chicago Tribune	4/4 stars
Entertainment Weekly	A+
Los Angeles Times	3.5/4 stars
Mojo	5/5 stars
NME	8/10
Q	4/5 stars
Rolling Stone	4/5 stars
Select	5/5
Uncut	4/5 stars

In a rave review for the Los Angeles Times, Chris Willman wrote that "Waits waxes equally fatalistic on morality and mortality" on Bone Machine, and that even "amid all this casual morbidity", the album's "low-fi, home-studio" sounds make the album "so much—in a manner of speaking—fun." "Rhythmically," said Greg Kot of the Chicago Tribune, "it's the most varied and impressive group of songs Waits has written, and damaged voice and all, the tunes are unshakable." Entertainment Weekly's Billy Altman noted that although listeners may find themselves "shocked, thrilled, or just plain unnerved by some startling image or sound" while listening to Bone Machine, "beneath his hellacious bellows ... and grotesque arrangements ... lurks a caring, humanist heart." NME writer Terry Staunton summarized the album as "scary, mournful, morbid and easily one of Tom's best."

Retrospectively, AllMusic reviewer Steve Huey deemed Bone Machine "Waits' most affecting and powerful recording, even if it isn't his most accessible", noting the album's "chilling, primal sound" and fixation with "decay and mortality, the ease with which earthly existence can be destroyed."

Bone Machine was included on several "Best Albums of the 1990s" lists, being ranked at No. 49 by Pitchfork and No. 53 by Rolling Stone. The album was also included in the book 1001 Albums You Must Hear Before You Die. Elvis Costello included it on his list of essential albums, highlighting "A Little Rain" and "I Don't Wanna Grow Up".

== Track listing ==
All tracks are written by Tom Waits, with additional writers noted.

No.	Title	Writer(s)	Length
1.	"Earth Died Screaming"		3:39
2.	"Dirt in the Ground"	Kathleen Brennan	4:08
3.	"Such a Scream"		2:07
4.	"All Stripped Down"		3:04
5.	"Who Are You"	Brennan	3:58
6.	"The Ocean Doesn't Want Me"		1:51
7.	"Jesus Gonna Be Here"		3:21
8.	"A Little Rain"	Brennan	2:58
9.	"In the Colosseum"	Brennan	4:50
10.	"Goin' Out West"	Brennan	3:19
11.	"Murder in the Red Barn"	Brennan	4:29
12.	"Black Wings"	Brennan	4:37
13.	"Whistle Down the Wind"		4:36
14.	"I Don't Wanna Grow Up"	Brennan	2:31
15.	"Let Me Get Up on It"		0:55
16.	"That Feel"	Keith Richards	3:11

== Personnel ==
=== Performance ===
- Tom Waits – lead vocals (all tracks), Chamberlin (1, 6, 9), percussion (1, 3–6, 15), guitar (1, 3, 5, 12, 14, 16), sticks (1), piano (2, 13), upright bass (7), conundrum (9), drums (10–12, 16), acoustic guitar (14)
- Brain – drums (3, 9)
- Kathleen Brennan – sticks (1)
- Ralph Carney – alto saxophone (2, 3), tenor saxophone (2, 3), bass clarinet (2)
- Les Claypool – bass guitar (1)
- Joe Gore – guitar (4, 10, 12)
- David Hidalgo – violin (13), accordion (13)
- Joe Marquez – sticks (1), banjo (11)
- David Phillips – pedal steel guitar (8, 13), steel guitar (16)
- Keith Richards – guitar (16), backing vocals (16)
- Larry Taylor – upright bass (1, 2, 4, 5, 8–12, 14, 16), guitar (7)
- Waddy Wachtel – guitar (16)

=== Production ===
- Tom Waits – producer
- Kathleen Brennan – associate producer
- Biff Dawes – recording (1–7, 9–12, 14–16)
- Joe Marquez– recording (8, 13)
- Tchad Blake – mixing (1–15)
- Biff Dawes – mixing (1–15)
- Joe Marquez – mixing (1–15), second engineer
- Joe Blaney – mixing (16)
- Shawn Michael Morris – third engineer
- Bob Ludwig – mastering
- Frances Thumm – "musical security guard"

== Charts ==
Chart performance for Bone Machine
Chart (1992)	Peak position
Australian Albums (ARIA)	41
Austrian Albums (Ö3 Austria)	22
Canada Top Albums/CDs (RPM)	48
Dutch Albums (Album Top 100)	31
German Albums (Offizielle Top 100)	42
New Zealand Albums (RMNZ)	36
Norwegian Albums (VG-lista)	15
Swedish Albums (Sverigetopplistan)	38
Swiss Albums (Schweizer Hitparade)	21
UK Albums (Official Charts)	26
US Billboard 200	176
