= Kathleen Brennan =

American songwriter and producer (b. 1955)

- Born: Kathleen Patricia Brennan; March 2, 1955 (age 71); Cork, Ireland
- Notable work: Franks Wild Years; The Black Rider; Woyzeck; Alice; Blood Money
- Spouse: Tom Waits (m. 1980)
- Children: 3

Kathleen Patricia Brennan (born March 2, 1955) is an Irish-American musician, songwriter, record producer, and artist. She is known for her work as a co-writer, producer, and influence on the work of her husband Tom Waits.

== Biography ==
Brennan was born in Cork, Ireland and grew up in Johnsburg, Illinois.

=== Association with Tom Waits ===
Brennan first met Tom Waits in 1978 on the set of Paradise Alley, where Brennan was a scriptwriter and Waits was making his acting debut. They met again during production of the Francis Ford Coppola film One from the Heart. At the time, Brennan worked at the American Zoetrope studio as a script analyst, while Waits composed the score for One from the Heart. According to Waits, they met on New Year's Eve.

Waits dedicated his 1980 song "Jersey Girl" to Brennan, and they were married later that year in the Always Forever Wedding Chapel. After they married, Brennan encouraged Waits to become his own producer.

Brennan is generally regarded as the catalyst for Waits' shift towards more experimental sound beginning with the 1983 album Swordfishtrombones, which Waits produced on a dare from Brennan. Her first co-writing credit appears on Rain Dogs in 1985 for "Hang Down Your Head", and by 1992 she was his main producer and song-writing partner. She introduced Waits to the music of Captain Beefheart. Her work includes co-writing and collaboration on the albums Franks Wild Years (1987), Alice (2002), and Blood Money (2002), as well as the musicals The Black Rider (1989) and Woyzeck (2000).

Waits has described Brennan as "a remarkable collaborator.... She's bold, inventive and fearless. That's who you wanna go in the woods with, right? Somebody who finishes your sentences for you." Waits has also said: "She doesn't like the limelight, but she's an incandescent presence on all songs we work on together." In 2008, Waits described their collaboration as "one person holds the nail and the other one swings the hammer". In 2020, Brennan described Waits' songs as either "grim reapers" or "grand weepers".

In 2023, Waits and Brennan oversaw reissues of remastered versions of Swordfishtrombones, Rain Dogs, Frank's Wild Years, Bone Machine, and The Black Rider. The remasters used original master tapes and were marketed as "The Island Years", because they were originally released on Island Records.

== Personal life ==
Brennan and Waits married in 1980, and they live in Sonoma County, California. They have three children.

== Honors and awards ==
In 2015, Brennan and Waits were honored as part of the This Is Dedicated: Music's Greatest Marriages show by Jarrod Spector and Kelli Barrett.

In 2016, Brennan was honored, along with Waits and John Prine, at The Song Lyrics of Literary Excellence Awards from PEN New England. The event was hosted by the JFK Library; during the event Colum McCann honored the creative partnership of Brennan and Waits, stating, "The world as we have it is their lucky anthem. They fling it open with their lives and a few strings and a voice that was somehow scratched by heaven.".
