= Sophie Villy =

Georgian-Ukrainian singer-songwriter (born 1990)

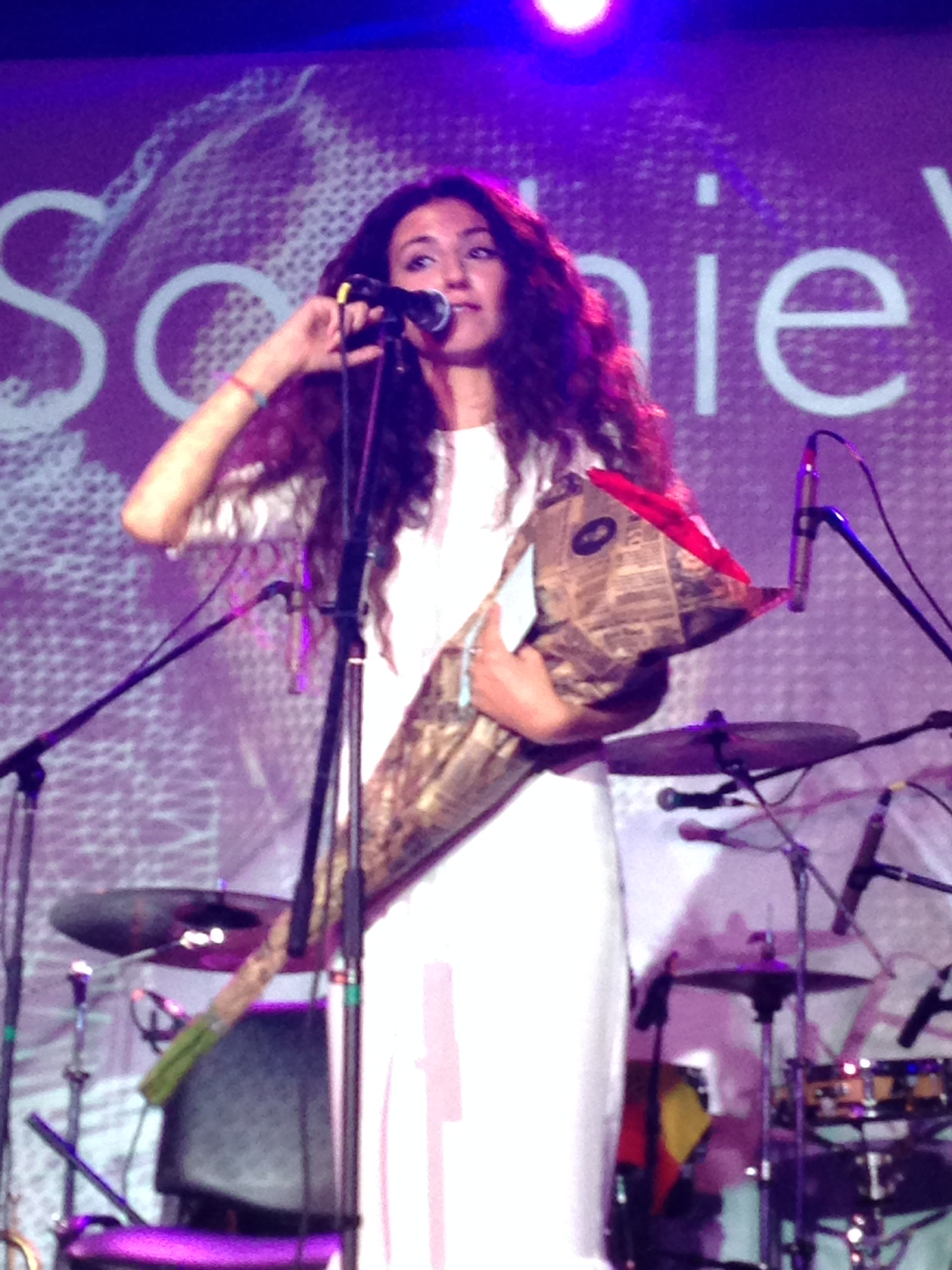
- Sophie Villy in 2014
- Born: 30 October 1990 (age 35); Tbilisi (Georgia)
- Occupations: Musician, singer/songwriter, composer, producer
- Website: sophievilly.com

Sophie Villy (Georgian: ხუციშვილი Khutsishvili; born on 30 October 1990 in Tbilisi, Georgia) is a Georgian-Ukrainian singer-songwriter, composer and producer, she performs internationally in both English and Georgian. Villy has composed soundtracks for feature films from Georgia, US and France, one of which "Lost in Escapade" was selected for the Cannes Festival Short Film Palme d'Or competition in 2015 and won Best Original Music at Spain's Euro Film Festival. She has been reported by KEXP, KCRW in Los Angeles, BBC Radio 2 and London's The Guardian newspaper as a representative of Georgia's new wave in music. Periodicals in Kyiv also document Villy's role within domestic songwriting. At a time of increasing nationalist tensions, her multilingual songs are debated by the Ukrainian and Georgian media as a protest of people who are tired of politics and aspire for peace in their country.

== Biography ==
At the age of five, Sophie began studying piano at a music school associated with the Tbilisi State Conservatoire and spent the next four years of her life there. Ultimately, however, she turned to the guitar and began composing her own material at the age of twelve. Between the ages of five and fifteen she traveled Europe, as a professional high diver. Qualifying for a wide range of diving competitions, she won Euromeeting in Strasbourg (2002), but was forced to abandon the sport due to a knee injury. Music gradually became an alternative to sport and Villy started playing in Tbilisi clubs at the age of sixteen.

Following the Russo-Georgian War of 2008, Villy moved to Kyiv, as she has both Georgian and Ukrainian ancestors. Here she finished studying tourism at university and formed her first group, Backstage. The band was a short-lived project and Villy began a solo career. She began playing in regional festivals, now as an independent singer-songwriter. Open-air performances included Koktebel Jazz Festival. Domestic billing then led to additional invitations from events in Florida, New York, and California. Once in America, Villy sang in English, as a result of which US periodicals noted––in several venues––the combined influences of Nina Simone, Jeff Buckley, and Nick Drake in her material.

A debut LP was published in 2012––"Mother Fish." Civic themes soon became evident in a politically charged single, entitled "Position" and dedicated to both private and political liberties in Georgia. The song was broadcast in heavy rotation on KCRW radio in California and simultaneously aired by Michael Sheen on BBC Radio Two in London. Britain's The Guardian newspaper listed Villy's 2014 song "Connected" among a global selection of new tracks––as airplay grew concurrently in both New York and Los Angeles. The following year a second album was published––"Dress"––while additional shows were announced across Europe. In Ukraine, "Dress" was declared Album of the Year by influential Ukrainian webzine Comma.Com.UA.

In 2015 Villy presented her side-project "Philosophie" in Europe and the United States, while opening for Mercury Prize and Brit Awards nominee Anna Calvi in Budapest. Also in 2015, she played at the SXSW festival in Texas. She has toured America on five occasions, headlining Fall Arts Festival in Florida, including a show (School Night) at New York's Brooklyn Bowl with Lana Del Rey's ex drummer Ryan Voughn, hosted by Chris Douridas and with onstage support in Los Angeles from Tom Waits' guitarist Omar Torrez. In 2013, she performed with the drummer of Melody Gardot, Chuck Staab. In April 2015 Villy collaborated with famous Georgian composers Dato Evgenidze and Nika Machaidze (Nikakoi). She also performed at the Shota Rustaveli Theatre with Dato Evgenidze.

In June 2015 Villy performed at the European Stadium of Culture in Poland and in July at the main stage of Tbilisi Open Air (with headliners Placebo, Archive, Beth Hart). Later in 2018 she performed at the main stage of Tbilisi Open Air with headliners Tom Odell, Rachael Yamagata, Roisin Murphy.

In autumn 2015 American record label Dado Records released "The Days" - her collaboration with the Georgian musician Sinoptik Music. In December she appeared in a tribute show for the Georgian musician and activist Irakli Charkviani, at the Tbilisi Concert Hall.

Sophie won "Best Artist" at "Phoenix" Music Awards. (2015)

In 2016 she was nominated by Electronauts as "Artist of the Year".

A third album from Villy was recently presaged by the song "Reveal" ––just before New Year's Day, 2016. As with interviews in the Ukrainian press, so the song struck a repeatedly political note. It was "dedicated to heroes internationally––who have shown a genuine love for their country." Since political tensions have worsened of late, Villy's catalog is increasingly seen in terms of a mediating role, between languages and conflicted cultures.

Planet A was released on April 18, 2017. The US tour started in NYC. Album won "Best alternative rock album" of Academia Music Awards in Los Angeles, in June.

In December 2017 she became a jury of the most famous kids song contest in Georgia - Ranina.

In September 2018 Villy set up an arts and music studio for children, called Soulscope. Since March 2022 Soulscope hosts Ukrainian children, who were forced to leave their homes due to the Russian invasion.

In November 2023 Villy won Hennessy Global project "All I Need” with the single “Flow”, in which she plays the Georgian traditional instrument Chuniri / ჭუნირი.

== Discography ==
=== Albums ===
- Mother Fish (2012)
- Dress (2014)
- Planet A (2017)
- Clarity (2026)

=== Singles ===
- "Position" (2012)
- "Connected" (2013)
- "Reveal" (2015)
- “Hold Me” Phylosophie (2015)
- "Swim On" feat. Nikakoi (2017)
- "I wanna see you clear" feat. sTia (2018)
- “All I Had” feat. Sinoptik Music (2018)
- “Papers” feat. Aero Benin (2018)
- " მზეში” / Praying in the Sun (2020)
- “What Can Be Worse” feat. Misha Pravilniy, The Maneken (2022)
- “I’m a Mother” feat. Giorgi Marr (2022)
- “BLACKOUT” (23/02/23)
- “Flow” (13/12/23)
- “A Wish”/ Natvra (27/12/23)
- "ZHYVY" (24/02/24)
- "MJERA" (12/12/24)

=== Video ===
- "Here And Nowhere Else” (2012)
- "Connected" (2013)
- "Sometimes I feel like a motherless child” (2013)
- "I Told You" (2014)
- "Swim On" (2017)
- "Planet A" (2018)
- "Another Existence "(2019)
- "What Can Be Worse” (2022)
- "I’m a Mother” (2022)
- "BLACKOUT " (2023)
