= Tbilisi Open Air =

Music festival in Tbilisi, Georgia

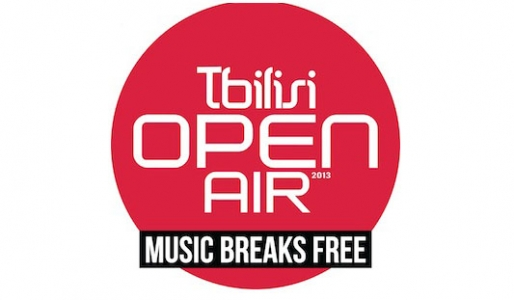
- Genre: Various
- Dates: 2009, 2011–present
- Locations: Tbilisi, Georgia; 41°43′21″N 44°47′33″E
- Years active: 2009–present
- Founders: AlterVision Group
- Website: www.tbilisiopenair.ge

Tbilisi Open Air is an annual international music festival, with the emphasis on electronic and rock music, first held in Tbilisi, Georgia, on 15–17 May 2009. After that the festival is organized each year and is widely considered the biggest music festival in the Caucasus region. The festival mainly maintains several-day outdoor event format.

As the organizers of Tbilisi Open Air clarify, "the defining idea behind the festival is freedom. This is freedom from stress, clichés, social controls, freedom to create and express, freedom to experience what is valued by every single one of us as individuals".

It was first held as an alternative to the Eurovision Song Contest 2009, which Georgia was disqualified from because of the political message of their song "We Don't Wanna Put In".

== 2023 ==
The 2023 edition was held on 23–25 June. The traffic of the festival was around 80,000, with around 30,000 festival-goers attending each day.

=== 23 June ===
Main Stage

- Tom Odell (United Kingdom)
- Bedford Falls (Georgia (country))
- She Past Away (Turkey)
- Tamada (Georgia (country))

Eye Stage

- Etapp Kyle (Ukraine)
- Mattheis (Netherlands)
- Yanamaste (Georgia (country))
- Le Violet (Georgia (country))

Zion Garden

- Liquid Soul (Sweden)
- Skizologic (Israel)
- AcidWave (Georgia (country))
- Soyl B2B Ancient Om (Georgia (country))

Singer Stage

- Tornike Gagoshvili (Georgia (country))
- Reso Kiknadze Quartet (Georgia (country))
- Kay G (Georgia (country))
- Singer Jazz Foundation Jam (Georgia (country))

=== 24 June ===
Main Stage

- Kaleo (Iceland)
- Rejjie Snow (Republic of Ireland)
- Circus Mircus (Georgia (country))
- Lua (Georgia (country))

Eye Stage

- Ben Klock (Germany)
- Audrey Danza (Switzerland)
- OTHR (Georgia (country))
- Zesknel (Live) (Georgia (country))

Zion Garden

- Dirty Saffi (United Kingdom)
- DJ Nuky (United Kingdom)
- Psymmetrix (United Kingdom)
- Katana (Georgia (country))

Singer Stage

- Mechanical Rainbow (Georgia (country))
- Dini Virsaladze Quartet (Georgia (country))
- Sabina Chantouria (Georgia (country))
- On The Road (Georgia (country))
- Alexander Kharanauli (Georgia (country))
- Process (Georgia (country))
- Jam Session By Sandro (Georgia (country))
- Nikoladze (Georgia (country))

=== 25 June ===
Main Stage

- Moderat (Germany)
- Imany (France)
- Ara (Georgia (country))
- 4D Monster Lobsters (Georgia (country))
- Skazz (Georgia (country))

Eye Stage

- Margaret Dygas (Germany)
- Rhadoo (Romania)
- OTHR (Georgia (country))
- Gio Shengelia (Georgia (country))

Zion Garden

- Braincell (Switzerland)
- Oogway (Georgia (country))
- DM3 (Georgia (country))
- Stultitia (Georgia (country))
- Chikovani (Georgia (country))

Singer Stage

- Bacho Jikidze & Misi Wonderband (Georgia (country))
- Pelargonia (Georgia (country))
- Kemtet (Georgia (country))
- Maikeru (Georgia (country))
- Leftside Story and Ekoterine (Georgia (country))
- Ducktape (Georgia (country))

== 2022 ==
The 2022 edition was held on 24–26 June and it was attended by more than 80,000 people. That broke the previous record and TOA 2022 became the most attended commercial music event in the history of Georgia. The festival supported Ukraine in the Russo-Ukrainian war that broke out that year, through donating part of the ticket and merch sales to the Ukrainian cause, supporting Ukraine through all media and communication channels, inviting pro-Ukrainian acts, etc.

=== 24 June ===
Main Stage

- Cigarettes After Sex (United States)
- Bedford Falls (Georgia (country))
- Konoba (Belgium)
- Kordz (Georgia (country))
- 4D Monster Lobsters (Georgia (country))
- Meme (Georgia (country))

Eye Stage

- Acid Pauli (Germany)
- Robag Wruhme (Germany)
- Jennifer Cardini (France)
- Bacho (Georgia (country))

Garden Stage

- Giuseppe (Italy)
- Sashi (Israel)
- DM3 (Georgia (country))
- Chikovani (Georgia (country))
- Dimitree (Georgia (country))
- Ellarge (Georgia (country))

Singer Stage

- Dini Virsaladze Quintet (Georgia (country))
- Salome Tsulukidze & Band (Georgia (country))
- Erekle Getsadze & Bad Habitz (Georgia (country))
- Luka Topuria Quartet (Georgia (country))
- Pelargonia (Georgia (country))

=== 25 June ===
Main Stage

- Alt-J (United Kingdom)
- Moku Moku (Georgia (country))
- არა (Georgia (country))
- Killages (Georgia (country))
- The Black Marrows (Georgia (country))

Eye Stage

- Konstantin (Germany)
- Map.Ache (Germany)
- Chloe (France)
- Tomma (Georgia (country))

Garden Stage

- Ajja (Switzerland)
- Oogway (Georgia (country))
- Katana (Georgia (country))
- Acnient Om (Georgia (country))
- Kaya Matu (Georgia (country))

Singer Stage

- Bacho Jikidze & Band (Georgia (country))
- კოლექტივი (Georgia (country))
- Reso Kiknadze Quintet (Georgia (country))
- Zaza Marjanishvili Quartet (Georgia (country))
- Melqo (Georgia (country))
- Process (Georgia (country))

=== 26 June ===
Main Stage

- Okean Elzy (Ukraine)
- Rhye (Canada)
- Molchat Doma (Belarus)
- Eko & Vinda Folio (Georgia (country))
- წერილი (Georgia (country))
- Nash Albert (Georgia (country))

Eye Stage

- Petre Inspirescu (Romania)
- Barac (Romania)
- Gio Shengelia (Georgia (country))
- Vako T (Georgia (country))

Zion Garden

- Fungus Funk (Russia)
- Additivv (Georgia (country))
- Ramyjin & Sukoharaa (Georgia (country))
- Acidwave (Georgia (country))
- Obri (Georgia (country))
- Kassra (Georgia (country))
- Marcuss (Georgia (country))
- Infest (Georgia (country))
- Holo (Georgia (country))

Singer Jazz Stage

- Tornike Gagoshvili (Georgia (country))
- Blinkroot (Georgia (country))
- Levan Japaridze & Killer Band (Georgia (country))
- Uma & Tuomas (Georgia (country))
- Guja Mardini Quartet (Georgia (country))
- Adikashvili & Gabadze (Georgia (country))
- Papuna Sharikadze Quartet (Georgia (country))

== 2020–2021 ==
In 2020, Tbilisi Open Air was set to be held from 26 June to 28 June, but due to the COVID-19 pandemic, it was cancelled.

In 2021, TOA again declined to hold the festival.

== 2019 ==
In 2019, TOA was held on the Lisi Wonderland field and went on for 3 days, with 4 stages operating. Total attendance was around 55,000. The festival dates coincided with the 20 June Tbilisi Riots. In light of those events, many statements were made by the festival promoters and artists from the festival stage.

=== 21 June ===
Main Stage

- Franz Ferdinand (United Kingdom)
- MokuMoku (Georgia (country))
- Loudspeakers (Georgia (country))
- St. Nudes (Georgia (country))
- 4D Monster Lobsters (Georgia (country))

Eye Stage

- Tobias. (United Kingdom)
- Edit Select (United Kingdom)
- Boyd Schidt (Georgia (country))
- OTHR (Georgia (country))

Garden Stage

- 1200 Mics By Riktam (Spain)
- GMS (Netherlands)
- Psymmetrix (United Kingdom)
- Aardvarkk (Russia)
- 3 of Life (Georgia (country))
- Oogway (Georgia (country))
- Acidwave (Georgia (country))
- Ancient OM (Georgia (country))

Singer Jazz Stage

- Dini Virsaladze Quintet (Georgia (country))
- Auditorium A Feat Guja Mardini (Georgia (country))
- Kemo Sextet (Georgia (country))
- Forest Rain (Georgia (country))
- Tornike Gagoshvili (Georgia (country))

=== 22 June ===
Main Stage

- Unkle (United Kingdom)
- Rhye (Canada)
- მწვანე ოთახი (Georgia (country))
- არა (Georgia (country))
- Nemra (Armenia)

Eye Stage

- David August (Germany)
- Maayan Nidam (Israel)
- Gio Shengelia (Georgia (country))
- Tomma (Georgia (country))
- Bacho (Georgia (country))

Garden Stage

- Pixel (Israel)
- Dirty Saffi (United Kingdom)
- DJ Nuki (Croatia)
- Marcuss (Georgia (country))
- Katana (Georgia (country))
- Ellarge (Georgia (country))

Singer Jazz Stage

- Blues Factor (Georgia (country))
- Freeride (Georgia (country))
- Old Road Band (Georgia (country))
- Zura Ramishvili Quartet (Georgia (country))
- Zuka Simonishvili Quartet (Georgia (country))
- Amaze (Georgia (country))

=== 23 June ===
Main Stage

- Mogwai (United Kingdom)
- The Subways (United Kingdom)
- Michelle Gurevich (Canada)
- Salio (Georgia (country))
- Bedford Falls (Georgia (country))

Eye Stage

- Andrey Pushkarev (Russia)
- Matthew Dekay (Netherlands)
- Cestlek (Azerbaijan)
- Mozzy (Azerbaijan)
- Vako T (Georgia (country))
- Lasha Maruashvili (Georgia (country))

Zion Garden

- Freedom Fighters (North Macedonia)
- Nigel (Russia)
- Obri & Zen (Georgia (country))
- Additivv (Georgia (country))

Singer Jazz Stage

- Bacho Jikidze & Band (Georgia (country))
- Windshield (Georgia (country))
- Lekso Ratiani (Georgia (country))
- Reso Kiknadze Sextet (Georgia (country))
- String Quartet Feat. Dani (Georgia (country))
- Blue Moor (Georgia (country))

== 2018 ==
In 2018, TOA was held on Lisi Wonderland and had a 3-day line-up. Around 70 artists performed on the festival. A new stage, Eye Stage, was devoted to techno/house music. Also a new space, Singer Jazz Stage, was devoted to mostly jazz artists. Total attendance was around 45,000.

=== 22 June ===
Main Stage

- Kayakata (Georgia (country))
- Sevdaliza (Iran)
- Beardyman (United Kingdom)
- Che Lingo (United Kingdom)
- Toyshen (Georgia (country))
- Eko & Vinda Folio (Georgia (country))

Eye Stage

- Roman Flugel (Germany)
- Cleveland (Belgium)
- Gio Shengelia (Georgia (country))
- Autumn Tree (Georgia (country))
- Vako T b2b Mzhavia (Georgia (country))

Zion Garden

- Avalon (United Kingdom)
- Ritmo (Israel)
- Fungus Funk (Russia)
- Acidwave (Georgia (country))
- Katana (Georgia (country))

Singer Jazz Stage

- Reso Kiknadze Quintet (Georgia (country))

=== 23 June ===
Main Stage

- Róisín Murphy (Republic of Ireland)
- Rachael Yamagata (United States)
- Papooz (France)
- St. Nudes (Georgia (country))
- MokuMoku (Georgia (country))
- Killages (Georgia (country))

Eye Stage

- Alex Niggemann (Germany)
- Matthias Meyer (Germany)
- Sascha Sibler (Germany)
- Liza Rivs (Georgia (country))
- Bero (Georgia (country))
- Stimmhalt (Georgia (country))
- Promescu (Georgia (country))

Zion Garden

- Yestermorrow (Portugal)
- Kala (North Macedonia)
- Eldario (Russia)
- Oogway (Georgia (country))
- Marcuss (Georgia (country))
- Ancient Om (Georgia (country))
- Ellarge (Georgia (country))
- Space Teryaki (Georgia (country))
- Tabu (Georgia (country))
- Beka Talakhadze (Georgia (country))

Singer Jazz Stage

- Dzini virsaladze Trio (Georgia (country))
- Blue Moor (Georgia (country))
- Lasha Abashmadze Quintet (Georgia (country))

=== 24 June ===
Main Stage

- Tom Odell (United Kingdom)
- Konoba (United States)
- Green Room (Georgia (country))
- Salio (Georgia (country))
- Sophie Villy (Georgia (country))
- Lua (Georgia (country))

Eye Stage

- Super Flu (Germany)
- Gio Shengelia (Georgia (country))
- Innelea (Georgia (country))
- Dastia (Georgia (country))
- So Laut (Georgia (country))
- Bekuchi (Georgia (country))

Zion Garden

- Anthill (North Macedonia)
- Additivv (Georgia (country))
- Obri & Zen (Georgia (country))
- Neverthesame (Georgia (country))
- Dmitree (Georgia (country))
- Infest (Georgia (country))
- Dm3 (Georgia (country))
- Kalratry (Georgia (country))
- Kaya Matu (Georgia (country))
- Ra (Georgia (country))

Singer Jazz Stage

- Zura Ramishvili Trio (Georgia (country))
- Amaze (Georgia (country))
- Papuna Sharikadze trio feat Misho Urushadze (Georgia (country))

== 2017 ==
In 2017, TOA was held on Lisi wonderland and had a 3-day line-up with around 40 artists. Around 30,000 persons attended the festival.

=== 16 June ===
Main Stage

- Anathema (United Kingdom)
- Sevdaliza (Iran)
- Backwarmer (Georgia (country))
- Psychonaut 4 (Georgia (country))
- Dagdagani (Georgia (country))

Golden Stage

- Nino Katamadze (Georgia (country))
- Ripperton (Switzerland)
- Cobert (Georgia (country))
- Bacho (Georgia (country))
- Kozmana (Georgia (country))

Zion Garden

- Eldario (Georgia (country))
- Space Teriyaki (Georgia (country))
- Dimitree (Georgia (country))
- Marcuss (Georgia (country))
- Tabu (Georgia (country))
- Additivv (Georgia (country))

=== 17 June ===
Main Stage

- Leningrad (Russia)
- Soft Eject (Georgia (country))
- Loudspeakers (Georgia (country))
- Eko & Vinda Folio (Georgia (country))
- არა (Georgia (country))

Golden Stage

- Friendly Mosquito (Georgia (country))
- Bedford Falls (Switzerland)
- Windshield (Georgia (country))
- Alex.Do (Germany)
- Greenbeam & Leon (Georgia (country))
- Sevda (Georgia (country))
- Iazikzazubami (Georgia (country))

Zion Garden

- Psysex (Israel)
- Go2sky (Georgia (country))
- Never thesame (Georgia (country))
- Meno (Georgia (country))
- Infest (Georgia (country))
- Kaya matu (Georgia (country))

=== 18 June ===
Main Stage

- Archive (United Kingdom)
- Young Georgian Lolitaz (Georgia (country))
- Salio (Georgia (country))
- Kung Fu Junkie (Georgia (country))
- The Black Marrows (Georgia (country))

Golden Stage

- Moku Moku (Georgia (country))
- Sexy Bicycle (Switzerland)
- SF – X (Georgia (country))
- Oxia (Georgia (country))
- Wiedmak (Georgia (country))
- Vako T (Georgia (country))

Zion Garden

- Dj Goblin (United Kingdom)
- Arjun Apu (India)
- Amrit Pavan (Georgia (country))
- Ougway (Georgia (country))
- Psyrati (Georgia (country))
- Katana (Georgia (country))

== 2016 ==
In 2016, TOA presented a 3-day line-up with over 60 artists. The festival had 3 stages: Main stage, LTFR/Night stage and Pirate Bay stage. Total attendance was over 30,000. Festival was held on 29–31 July, on a location near Lisi Lake, which received nickname "Lisi Wonderland".

=== 29 July ===
Main Stage

- Air (France)
- Morcheeba (United Kingdom)
- Motorama (Russia)
- Kung Fu Junkie (Georgia (country))
- Dihaj (Azerbaijan)
- Bedford Falls (Georgia (country))

LTFR/Night Stage

- Adriatique (Switzerland)
- Nikakoi & TBA (Georgia (country))
- Vako Key (Georgia (country))
- Lasha Craft (Georgia (country))

Pirate Bay Stage

- Aardvark (United Kingdom)
- Pogo (United Kingdom)
- FOG (Italy)
- Psart (Russia)
- Katana (Georgia (country))
- Marcuss (Georgia (country))
- Meno – Project Pheodal (Georgia (country))
- Saba (Georgia (country))
- Amit Pavan (Georgia (country))

=== 30 July ===
Main Stage

- Unkle (United Kingdom)
- Steve Vai (United States)
- Nika Kocharov & Young Georgian Lolitaz (Georgia (country))
- Backwarmer (Georgia (country))
- Scarlet. (United Kingdom)
- Lelocity (Armenia)

LTFR/Night Stage

- Moodymann (United States)
- Betoko (Mexico)
- Henning Baer (Germany)
- Vako T. (Georgia (country))
- Tuji (Georgia (country))
- Rejjie Snow (Republic of Ireland)
- Luna 999 (Georgia (country))
- Cutkill & Shining (Georgia (country))
- Sabanadze (Georgia (country))
- Tareshi (Georgia (country))
- Exit (Georgia (country))

Pirate Bay Stage

- Clarity (United Kingdom)
- Dima Dadiani (Georgia (country))
- Ciga (Georgia (country))
- Subex (Georgia (country))
- Mangiphera (Georgia (country))

=== 31 July ===
Main Stage

- Damien Rice (Republic of Ireland)
- Tricky (United Kingdom)
- Blue Foundation (United States)
- Eko & Vinda Folio (Georgia (country))
- Robi Kukhianidze& Ketato (Georgia (country))
- Quartet Diminished (Azerbaijan)

LTFR/Night Stage

- Dense & Pika (United Kingdom)
- The Forest (Georgia (country))
- Natalie Beridze TBA (Georgia (country))
- Mao (Georgia (country))
- Friendly Mosquito (Georgia (country))
- Kordz (Georgia (country))
- ზურმუხტისფერი ბედის ორდენი (Georgia (country))
- MAMM (Georgia (country))
- EKO (Georgia (country))

Pirate Bay Stage

- Black Dub Odyssey (United Kingdom)
- Vazhmarr (Georgia (country))
- Beveluke (Georgia (country))
- Uru (Georgia (country))
- Teko (Georgia (country))
- Liza Rivs (Georgia (country))

== 2015 ==
In 2015, TOA presented a 5-day line-up with over 60 artists. This was by far the biggest musical event that had ever happened in Caucasus or Middle Earth and the festival broke all records in social media, having three times more feedback than in 2013. Also this was the first time when besides the main stage, two additional stages were built: golden stage and Bassiani stage. Attendance was over 50,000, which was also a record for the whole region.

=== 3 July ===
Main Stage

- Zemfira (Russia)
- Akvarium (Russia)
- The Tiger Lillies (United Kingdom)
- Mellow (Georgia (country))
- Ducktape (Georgia (country))

Golden Stage

- Kollektiv Turmstrasse (Germany)
- Stephan Bodzin (Germany)
- The Forest (Georgia (country))
- Greenbeam & Leon (Georgia (country))
- NewA (Georgia (country))

=== 4 July ===
Main Stage

- Archive (United Kingdom)
- Soap&Skin (Austria)
- Gravity (Georgia (country))
- The Black Marrows (Georgia (country))
- The Mins (Georgia (country))

Golden Stage

- Mujuice (Russia)
- Oimactta (Georgia (country))
- Zurkin (Georgia (country))
- Green Room feat Dato Lomidze (Georgia (country))
- Ara (Georgia (country))
- Erekle Deisadze & Vinda Folio (Georgia (country))

=== 5 July ===
Main Stage

- Black Label Society (United States)
- Bambir (Armenia)
- Sophie Villy (Georgia (country))
- Scratch The Floor (Georgia (country))
- Vanilla Cage (Georgia (country))

Golden Stage

- Gui Boratto (Brazil)
- Bacho & Cobert (Georgia (country))
- Vako Key (Georgia (country))
- Bero (Georgia (country))
- Denis Jones (United Kingdom)
- Tomma Chaladze (Georgia (country))
- Tserili (Georgia (country))
- Old Road Band (Georgia (country))

=== 6 July ===
Main Stage

- Beth Hart (United States)
- Kill It Kid (United Kingdom)
- Salio (Georgia (country))
- MaMM (Georgia (country))
- The Jetbird (Georgia (country))

Golden Stage

- The Georgians (Georgia (country))
- The Pulse (Georgia (country))
- MTP (Georgia (country))
- Gacha (Georgia (country))
- Vaska (Georgia (country))
- Gabunia (Georgia (country))
- Vako T (Georgia (country))
- Lasha Craft (Georgia (country))

=== 7 July ===
Main Stage

- Placebo (United Kingdom)
- Loudspeakers (Georgia (country))
- The Bearfox (Georgia (country))
- Afternoon Version (Georgia (country))
- backwarmer (Georgia (country))

Golden Stage

- Lady Heroine (Georgia (country))
- Mother on Mondays (Georgia (country))
- The Window (Georgia (country))

== 2014 ==
In 2014 the festival returned to three-day outdoor festival format. Total attendance was 21,000. Although criticized for a smaller line-up than in former years, the organizers announced this was "a decision essential to switch back to the fields and prepare for 2015, which should be the biggest event both by line-up and scale". Due to heavy rain on the second day of the festival, Chinawoman and Lapalux were cancelled on 7 June and were added to the 8 June line-up.

=== 6 June ===
- Nino Katamadze (Georgia (country))
- Nikakoi (Georgia (country))
- Gravity (Georgia (country))
- Ara (Georgia (country))
- Lasha Kicks (Georgia (country))
- The Black Marrows (Georgia (country))

=== 7 June ===
- Oimactta (Georgia (country))
- Lapalux (United Kingdom)
- Chinawoman (Canada)
- Alina Orlova (Lithuania)
- Loudspeakers (Georgia (country))
- Scratch the Floor (Georgia (country))
- The Jetbird (Georgia (country))
- The Pulse (Georgia (country))

=== 8 June ===
- Nochniye Snaiperi (Russia)
- Green Room (Georgia (country))
- Kung Fu Junkie (Georgia (country))
- The Bearfox (Georgia (country))
- Electric Appeal (Georgia (country))
- Weekend Pop (Georgia (country))

== 2013 ==
In 2013 the festival was held in the Dinamo Arena Stadium. Total attendance was 19,000. With Deep Purple as headliner, the line-up was the biggest happening in the region and received a lot of local and foreign media interest, especially from Armenia, Russia, Turkey and Azerbaijan. Despite this, after the event the organizers of the festival stated their opinion that Tbilisi Open Air belonged more to outdoor fields than stadiums or buildings. "We received invaluable experience, but the heart of the festival stays with the fields", stated organizer Achiko Guledani. "Next time we will try to accept the challenge to bring even bigger line-up there."

=== 5 June ===
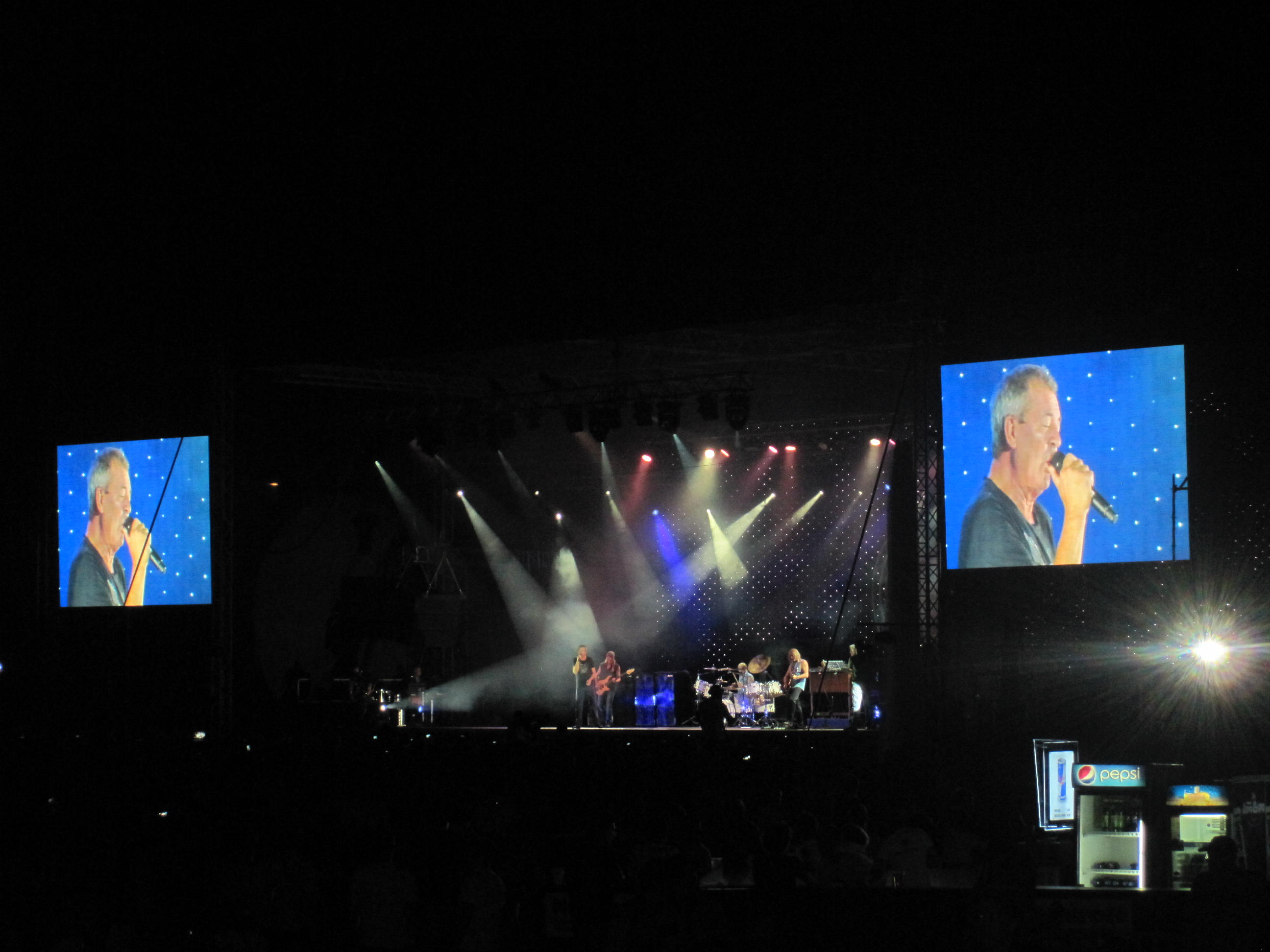
Deep Purple at Tbilisi Open Air 2013

- Deep Purple (United Kingdom)
- Infected Mushroom (United States)
- Tricky (United Kingdom)
- The Subways (United Kingdom)
- Modeselektor (Germany)
- Black Strobe (France)
- Kid Jesus (Georgia (country))

== 2012 ==
The 2012 event was held on Tbilisi Valley at the outskirts of the city. Headliner of the festival was legendary Russian band DDT, which caused a lot of local interest. Total attendance was over 50,000, which remains as a record not only in Georgia, but in the whole Caucasus region.

=== 2 June ===
- Lyapis Trubetskoy (Belarus)
- Wasp'N'Hornet (Belarus)
- Tai Chi Swayze (United Kingdom)
- Svansikh (Georgia (country))
- Pornopoezia (Georgia (country))
- U.R. (Georgia (country))
- Outsider (Georgia (country))
- dOP (France)
- Zoo Brazil (Spain)
- Green Room (Georgia (country))
- Sikha (Georgia (country))
- Bero (Georgia (country))
- Vako K (Georgia (country))
- The Forest (Georgia (country))
- Vako T (Georgia (country))

=== 3 June ===
- DDT (Russia)
- Dub FX (Australia)
- Transmitter (Germany)
- Plus Master (Georgia (country))
- Rema (Georgia (country))
- Zurgi (Georgia (country))
- Loudspeakers (Georgia (country))

== 2011 ==
The 2011 event was held on Tbilisi Hippodrome. Total Attendance was 10,000.

=== 11 June ===
- Herr Styler (France)
- Wallace Vanborn (Belgium)
- The Benedicts (Georgia (country))
- Mutual Friends (Georgia (country))
- The Smile (Georgia (country))
- Ketrine & Me (Georgia (country))
- Tako & Green Mama (Georgia (country))
- MAMM (Georgia (country))
- Z For Zulu (Georgia (country))

=== 12 June ===
- Moodorama (Germany)
- The Fades (United Kingdom)
- String (Georgia (country))
- Exit (Georgia (country))
- Pornopoezia (Georgia (country))
- Salio (Georgia (country))
- Space Jam (Georgia (country))
- U.R. (Georgia (country))

== 2009 ==
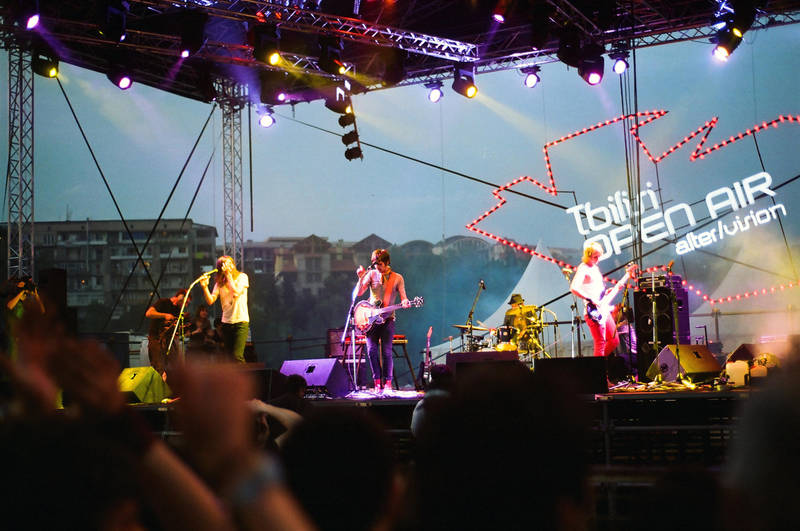
The Blue Van from Denmark performing at Tbilisi Open Air on 17 May 2009.

The 2009 event was held in Tbilisi, on Sharden Street (15 May) and on local hippodrome (16–17 May). Total attendance was 35,000. As it was the first big happening since 1980 Tbilisi Rock Festival, the festival was covered by foreign media: Times Online, Reuters, El Mundo, Corriere della Sera, Associated Press, Nouvel Observateur etc. 23 bands from nine countries participated in the festival. It stimulated the local music business and boosted the numbers of new artists.

=== 15 May ===
- Transglobal Underground (United Kingdom)
- The Black & Reds (United Kingdom)
- Cheese People (Russia)
- The Travelling Band (United Kingdom)
- Play Paranoid (Georgia (country))
- Smile (Georgia (country))

=== 16 May ===
- Jazzanova Live feat. Paul Randolph (Germany)
- ANDY (Poland)
- Curry And Coco (France)
- Laki Lan (Poland)
- The Haggis Horns (United Kingdom)
- Motel Connection (Italy)
- Keti Orjonikidze And Dr. Saga's Funk Rock Project (Georgia (country))
- The Dhol Foundation (United Kingdom)

=== 17 May ===
- Rook And The Ravens (United Kingdom)
- Brooklyn (France)
- String (Georgia (country))
- Cynic Guru (Iceland)
- The Blue Van (Denmark)
- Dubstepler (Ukraine)
- Ten Bears (United Kingdom)
- Stephane & 3G (Georgia (country))
- Fred Falke (France)

== Camping ==
In 2012 Tbilisi Open Air started allowing tent camping as an option for festival lodging. The campground site is adjacent to the venue grounds and has its own entrance from the venue. Festival campers come from different countries.

== Weather ==
The festival is held most often in June. Temperatures during the festival's history have ranged from 25 °C in May to 32 °C in June. Tbilisi has mostly welcoming weather in summer and the same holds true for the event.

== Management ==
Tbilisi Open Air is run by Altervision Group, which mainly consists of former and active musicians/producers. The first concept of the festival was created by Achiko Guledani, Vaho Babunashvili, Irakli Nadareishvili and Beqa Japaridze in 2009. Nowadays the decision-making board of Tbilisi Open Air consists of 7 people. The festival is booked by David Tsintsadze.
