= NME (disambiguation) =

NME, or New Musical Express, is a popular music magazine in the UK.

NME may also refer to:

== Science and medicine ==
- N-Methylamide, a peptide C-terminal cap
- National Medical Enterprises, a former name of Tenet Healthcare
- Necrolytic migratory erythema, a symptom observed in patients with glucagonoma
- New molecular entity, in drug discovery
- Necrotizing meningoencephalitis, a disease of small-breed dogs

== Other ==
- Enemy (eSports), often abbreviated NME, former professional eSports organization based in California
- National Military Establishment, a former name of the United States Department of Defense
- New Manufacturing Economy, a term used for "advanced manufacturing" in the "new economy"
- Nissan Motorsport Europe, a British-based motorsport arm of Nissan Motors
- Non-market economics, study of the economy via mechanisms other than the market
- NME, IATA code for Nightmute Airport
- NME, an abbreviation for Australian hip-hop group No Money Enterprise
- North Melbourne railway station
