= Chihuahua (dog breed) =

Mexican breed of dog

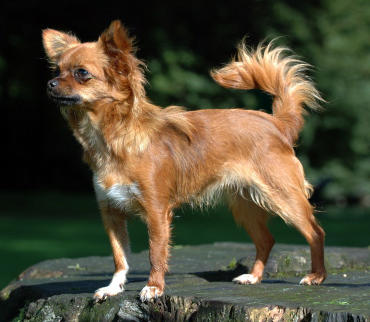
- Other names: Chihuahueño
- Origin: Mexico
Traits
- Height: 8–23 cm (3–9 in)
- Weight: 1–3 kg (2–7 lb)
- Coat: short-haired (smooth) or long-haired
- Color: all colors admitted, except merle
Kennel club standards
- Fédération Cynologique Internationale: standard

The Chihuahua (Note: English: /tʃɪˈwɑːwə, -wɑː, -ˈwaʊ.ə/; Spanish: [tʃiˈwawa].) or Chihuahueño is a Mexican breed of toy dog and the smallest recognized dog breed in the world. It is primarily kept as a companion animal and is characterized by its compact size, large erect ears, and rounded skull. The breed occurs in both short- and long-coated varieties, with a wide range of colors and patterns.

Genetic studies indicate that the Chihuahua retains a small proportion of pre-Columbian indigenous American dog ancestry, distinguishing it from most modern breeds, which are largely of European origin. The breed was formally recognized in the early twentieth century and has since become one of the most popular companion dogs worldwide.

== History ==
DNA studies suggest that native American dogs entered North America from Siberia approximately 10,000 years ago and were subsequently isolated from other breeds for approximately 9,000 years until the arrival of the first Europeans; these pre-contact dogs exhibited a unique genetic signature that is now nearly extinct. A study based on sequencing of ancient dog genomes, published in 2020, suggests that this pre-colonial ancestry survives in two Mexican breeds, to the extent of about 4% in the Chihuahua (and some 3% in the Xoloitzcuintli). An earlier study (2013) had suggested that the pre-colonial ancestry of the Chihuahua might be as high as 70%.

Colonial records refer to small, nearly hairless dogs from the early 19th century; one account claims that 16th-century conquistadores found them plentiful in the region later known as Chihuahua. In a letter written in 1520, Hernan Cortés wrote that the Aztecs raised and sold little dogs as food.

The American Kennel Club first registered a Chihuahua in 1904, Midget, owned by H. Raynor of Texas.

== Characteristics ==
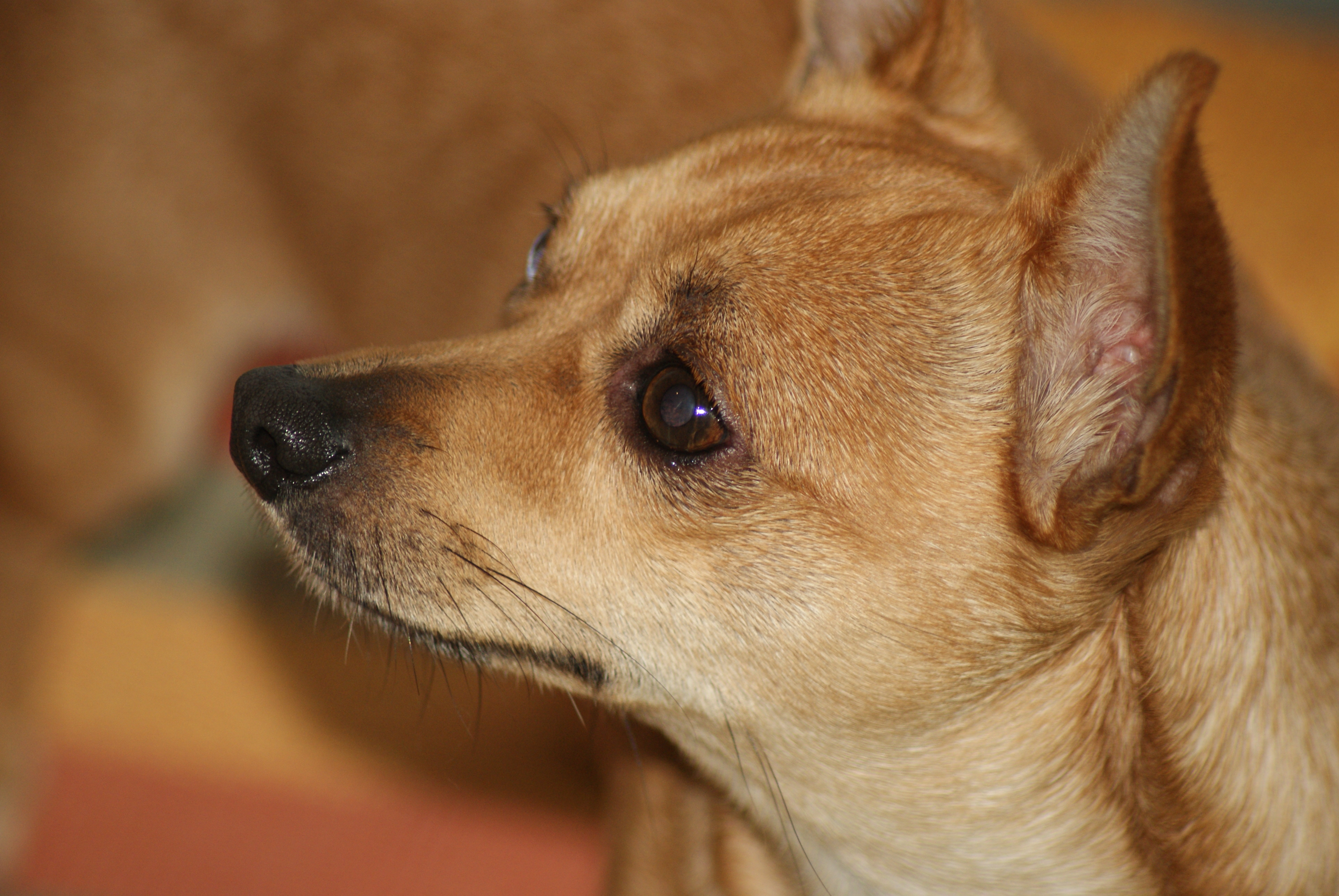
A shorthair deer-head Chihuahua's head

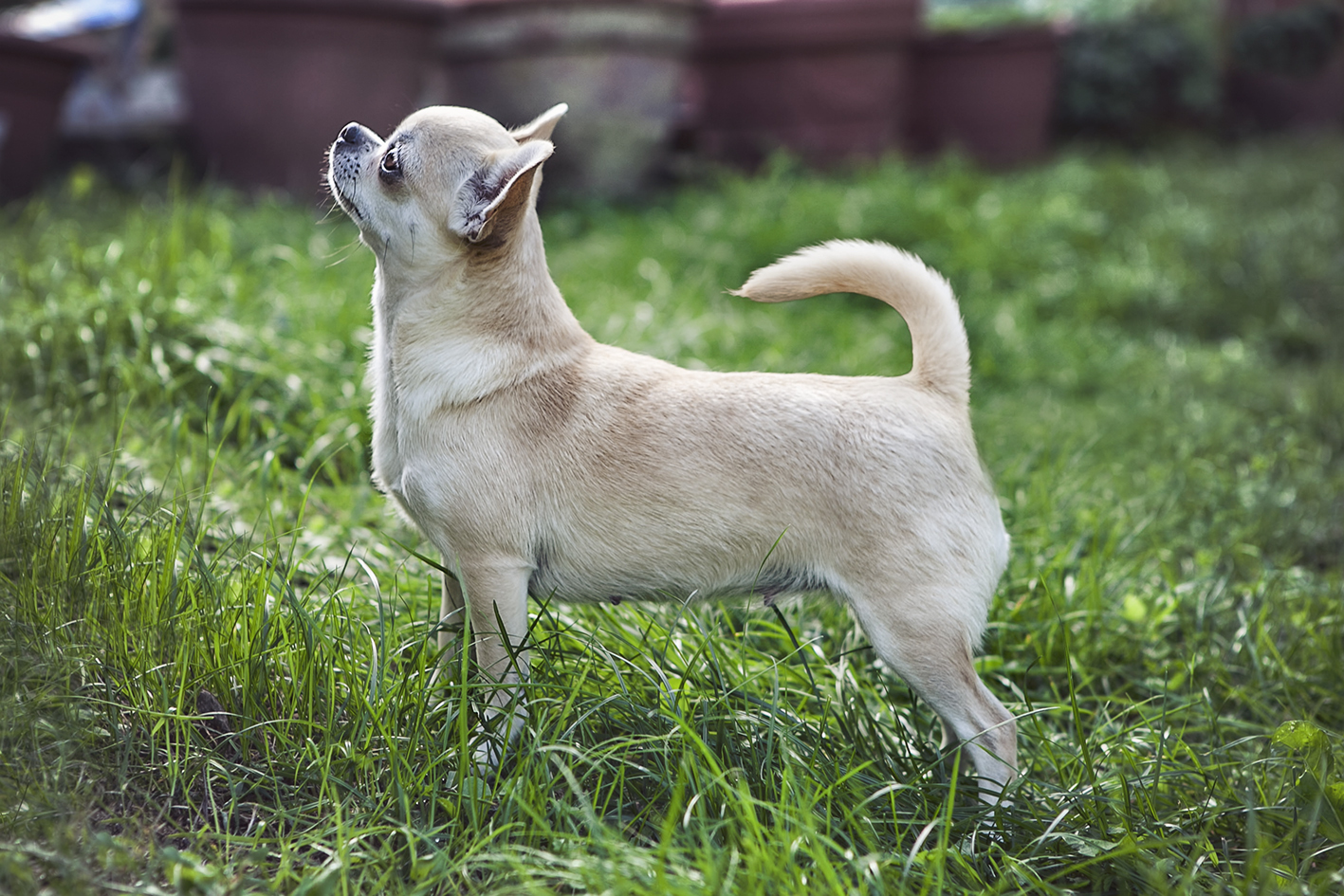
A shorthair apple-head Chihuahua, showing pronounced stop

Chihuahua breed standards specify an "apple-shaped" skull, also referred to as an "apple-dome" conformation. Chihuahuas can appear in almost any coat color or pattern, ranging from solid to marked or splashed, meaning the coat has an underlying darker color with scattered lighter patches. Apple-dome Chihuahuas have large, round eyes and large, erect ears, set in a high, dramatically rounded skull. Chihuahuas have a feature on their heads called the molera, which is a soft spot much like the fontanel found in human infants. It can be hard to see but is easy to feel by touch. The stop is well defined, forming a near 90-degree angle where the muzzle meets the skull. Dogs of the older "deer" type, with a flat-topped head, more widely set eyes, larger ears, and longer, more slender legs, may still be registered, but the deer head is not considered a separate type in competition and a deer-head dog's digression from the breed standard is considered a fault.

Breed standards for this dog do not generally specify a height; only a weight and a description of their overall proportions. Generally, the height ranges between 15 and 23 cm (6 and 9 in); some dogs grow to 30 to 38 cm (12 to 15 in).

The Fédération Cynologique Internationale standard calls for dogs ideally between 1.5 and 2.5 kg (3.3 and 5.5 lb); those outside the range 1.0–3.0 kg (2.2–6.6 lb) are disqualified from exhibition. The American breed standard sets a maximum weight of 2.7 kg (5.9 lb) for showing. In the British standard a weight of 1.8–2.7 kg (4–6 lb) is preferred – the clause "if two dogs are equally good in type, the more diminutive one is preferred" was removed in 2009.

Pet Chihuahuas, those bred or purchased primarily as companions rather than show dogs, often weigh more than the breed standard, sometimes exceeding 4.5 kg (9.9 lb), particularly if they have heavier bone structures or are allowed to become overweight. This does not mean that they are not purebred Chihuahuas; they just do not meet the requirements to enter a conformation show. Chihuahuas do not breed true for size, and puppies from the same litter can mature in drastically different sizes from one another. Also, larger breeding females are less likely to experience dystocia (obstructed labor). Many breeders try to breed Chihuahuas to be as small as possible, because those marketed as "teacup" or "tiny teacup" demand higher prices.

The international standard disallows the merle coat pattern, which appears mottled. Some breeders believe the coat to be associated with auditory and ocular issues, leading to it being a disqualified colour. Despite breeder concerns one study found no deafness in 18 merle Chihuahuas.

Like many other small dogs, the Chihuahua may display above-average aggression toward people and other dogs. According to the American Kennel Club, chihuahuas are not recommended for families with young children. However, they tend to be mildly good with other dogs, though varyingly, depending on the breed of the other dog.

== Health ==
Domestic breed in Mexico

The Chihuahua has some genetic predisposition to several neurological diseases, among them atlantoaxial instability, ceroid lipofuscinosis, congenital deafness, congenital hydrocephalus, muscular dystrophy, necrotizing meningoencephalitis, and neuroaxonal dystrophy; it has a mild predisposition to congenital heart disease. In a radiographical study of canine periodontal disease in 2001, the Chihuahua was found to have the lowest incidence of the six breeds studied. The predisposition to medial patellar luxation is believed to be significant.

Puppies of toy breeds such as the Chihuahua are susceptible to hypoglycaemia, often as a consequence of hypothermia.

A 2018 study in Japan of pet cemetery data found the Chihuahua to have an average life expectancy of 11.8 years compared to 15.1 for crossbreeds and 13.7 overall. A 2022 UK study on life expectancy of dog breeds based on veterinary data showed the average life expectancy to be 7.91 for the breed compared to 11.82 years for crossbreeds. (Note: The Japanese study reviewed cemetery data which is unlikely to have any records of still-births and altricial deaths whilst a veterinary clinic likely would have data on these.) A 2024 UK study found a life expectancy of 11.8 years for the breed compared to an average of 12.7 for purebreeds and 12 for crossbreeds. A 2024 Italian study found a life expectancy of 8.5 years for the breed compared to 10 years overall.

Such tiny dogs often have difficulty whelping. A UK study found the incidence of dystocia in Chihuahua bitches to be 10.4 times higher than the average for all dogs.

== See also ==
- Russian Toy Terrier
- Prague Ratter
