= Romeo Is Bleeding (disambiguation) =

Romeo Is Bleeding is a 1993 neo-noir crime thriller film directed by Peter Medak.

Romeo Is Bleeding may also refer to:

- Romeo Is Bleeding (2015 film), a documentary film about poetry
- "Romeo Is Bleeding" (song), a song by Tom Waits from the album Blue Valentine
  - Romeo Bleeding: Live from Austin, an unapproved live album by Waits
- "Romeo Is Bleeding," a song by Hall & Oates from the album Marigold Sky
