= Bruce Purse =

American musician

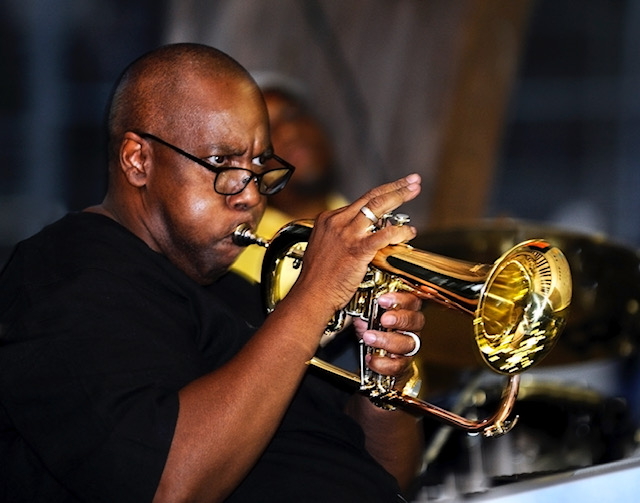

Background information
- Born: Bruce Clayton Purse; Birmingham, Alabama, U.S.
- Genres: Jazz, soul, R&B, blues, avant-garde jazz, hip-hop soul, reggae
- Occupations: Musician, composer, writer, artist, producer
- Label: Next Plateau

Bruce Clayton Purse is an American musician, composer, producer, vocalist, bandleader, arranger, performer, music educator, and guest lecturer. Proficient at various wind instruments, including the trumpet, pocket trumpet, bass trumpet, and flugelhorn, Purse has performed with many well known artists, such as Lester Bowie, Amy Winehouse, Jennifer Hudson, Alicia Keys, Faith Evans, Nas, Leona Lewis, and Johnny Kemp. He has also assembled large ensembles from a 11-piece bands to 30 piece orchestras, including his premiere ensemble called Bruce Purse and the Pocketbooks. The band performs originals in various genres such as; jazz, reggae, R&B, and heavy blues.

Purse describes himself as a sound mentalist. He creates music acoustically and digitally. In addition, he writes stories and plays.

Purse is the president of bcpurse music.

== Early life ==
Purse was born in Birmingham, Alabama. He grew up listening to music on the radio, television, and in church. Bruce was exposed to gospel music, jazz, spirituals, rhythm and blues, and country music. He moved to St. Louis as an adolescent. Bruce was introduced to the trumpet and instrumental music at an assembly performance at his Middle School in St. Louis, Missouri.

Purse started at an early age in his teens at Sumner High School in St. Louis, Missouri with William Paul Overbey. He attended Southern Illinois University Edwardsville for his Baccalaureate Degree. He completed Masters work at Columbia University, ultimately receiving his Master's degree from Lehman College in music education in New York City.

One of his earliest influences in music growing up was Louis Armstrong, who he heard on the radio and television and who inspired his fascination with the trumpet.

== Career ==
Purse has performed as musician with Lester Bowie's Brass Fantasy. His band called Bruce Purse and the Pocketbooks and other ensembles such as his 11-piece big band with members that has included Vincent Henry, Tyrone Jefferson, Bob Stewart (musician), Lonnie Plaxico, and Frank Lacy. He has written, arranged and performed for Amy Winehouse, Johnny Kemp, Peter Brown, Arthur Blythe, Alicia Keys, Craig Harris, Leona Lewis, Faith Evans, Mary J. Blige, Olu Dara, Stanton Davis, Malachi Thompson, Noel Pointer, Melba Moore, Youssou N'Dour, P-Diddy, Heavy D, Erica Badu, Zap Mama, Garland Jeffreys, Toots & the Maytals, Sybil (singer), Nas, Alison Hinds, Anthony Hamilton (musician), Pete Brown, Stanton Davis, Vincent Chancey, Steve Turre, Phillip Wilson, Salaam Remi, Joseph Bowie, Henry Threadgill, Julius Hemphill, The Blind Boys of Alabama.

He has composed for the anthologies for the Art Ensemble of Chicago.

Bruce is a music educator and guest lecturer. He has been an artist-in-residence with the New York City Board of Education, with Lincoln Center Jazz with Wynton Marsalis, LaGuardia Performing Arts High School, New School for Social Research, and the Harlem School of the Arts.

In 2018, Bruce portrayed himself in the Classic Albums (TV Series documentary) Amy Winehouse: Back to Black.

In 2016, Purse wrote the play "The Band Room" about his musical educational experience at Sumner High School, in St. Louis, Mo. His teachers were William Paul Overbey and Ken Billups. The play was produced and directed by the Susan Watson Turner, and performed at Lehman College, in the Bronx, New York City. The play takes place in the late 1968 in St. Louis during the Civil Rights Movement.

In 2019, Bruce Purse composed and produced the music for the narrative film entitled Rapid Deployment 'We Belong Network'. It was screened in 2019 at the Black International Cinema in Berlin, Germany.

He is a member of American Society of Composers, Authors and Publishers known as ASCAP.

== Instruments ==
Trumpet, pocket trumpet, flugel horn, baritone horn, bass trumpet, French horn

== Discography ==
=== As a composer, producer, arranger & musician ===
- 2018 The Art Ensemble of Chicago and Associated Ensembles
- 2017 Elaborations/Light Blue: Arthur Blythe Plays Thelonious Monk
- 2005 Just Got Paid - Johnny Kemp
- 2001 Up Close and Personal; Angie Martinez Guitar, Horn, Keyboards, Horn Arrangements, Keyboard Arrangements, Guitar Arrangements
- 2000 Privacy Ophélie Winter Producer
- 1998 Logic Pride, Vol. 1
- 1990 Vincent Vincent Henry
- 1990 Thirsty Janice Dempsey
- 1990 My Way Lester Bowie
- 1999 Inside My Mind DJ Ernie
- 1998 Logic Pride, Vol. 1
- 1993 Never Lose Your Heart - Noel Pointer
- 1993 F Stops - Craig Harris
- 1993 Doin' It Now! Sybil Producer, Arranger, Composer
- 1992 The Fire This Time - Lester Bowie's Brass Fantasy
- 1987 Secrets of Flying - Johnny Kemp Producer, Arranger, Trumpet, Keyboards, Programming, Horn Arrangements, String Arrangements, Composer
- 1987 Pale Fire - Alithea / Gust William Tsilis
- 1996 Lay Down - Nalini; Producer, Programming
- 1996 Case - Case Case (singer)
- 1987 Secrets of Flying - Johnny Kemp Producer, Arranger, Trumpet, Keyboards, Programming, Horn Arrangements, String Arrangements
- 1985 I Only Have Eyes for You - Lester Bowie's Brass Fantasy - Trumpet

=== Side man ===
- 2015 Amy Winehouse [The Original Soundtrack]: instruments - Trumpet, Flugel horn, Trumpet, Trumpet (Bass)
- 2012 The Album Collection: Amy Winehouse; instruments - Flugel horn, Horn (Baritone), Trumpet, Trumpet (Bass)
- 2011 Lioness: Hidden Treasures: Amy Winehouse; Trumpet
- 2011 It's Not the Same: Liam Bailey; Trumpet
- 2011 I Remember Me: Jennifer Hudson; Bass, Trumpet
- 2011 Back to Love: Anthony Hamilton; Flugel horn, Trumpet
- 2010 Mind, Body & Soul/The Soul Sessions: Joss Stone; Flugel horn, Trumpet
- 2009 Got the Bug, Vol. 2 : Bugz in the Attic; Flugel horn, Trumpet, Trumpet (Bass)
- 2009 2 Sides of My Heart, Vol. 1 - Gramps Morgan; Horn
- 2008 Remixed Alicia Keys - Trumpet, Flugel horn
- 2008 Nas - Nas; Horn, Vocals (Background)
- 2008 Better in Time - Leona Lewis; Trumpet, Trumpet (Bass), Flugel horn
- 2007 Throwback: Harlem 1979–1983; Leroy Burgess; Trombone (Tenor), Trombone (Bass)
- 2007 Spirit - Leona Lewis; Trumpet, Trumpet (Bass), Flugelhorn
- 2007 Soca Queen - Alison Hinds; Main Personnel, Trumpet, Trumpet (Bass), Flugel horn
- 2007 I Am - Chrisette Michele; Trumpet (Bass)
- 2006 Reflections (A Retrospective) - Mary J. Blige; Main Personnel, Trumpet
- 2006 Hip Hop Is Dead - Na; s Trumpet, Trumpet (Bass), Flugel horn
- 2006 Back to Black - Amy Winehouse; Trumpet, Trumpet (Bass), Flugel horn
- 2004 Take the Box - Amy Winehouse; Trumpet, Trumpet (Bass), Flugel horn
- 2004 Street's Disciple - Nas; Trumpet, Flugel horn
- 2004 Mind, Body & Soul - Joss Stone; Trumpet, Flugel horn
- 2004 In My Bed - Amy Winehouse; Trumpet, Trumpet (Bass), Flugel horn
- 2004 Got the Bug - Bugz in the Attic; Trumpet, Trumpet (Bass), Flugel horn
- 2004 After the Sunset - Horn
- 2003 Stronger Than Me - Amy Winehouse; Trumpet, Flugel horn, Bass
- 2003 Frank - Amy Winehouse; Trumpet, Trumpet (Bass), Flugel horn, Horn (Baritone)
- 2002 Selected Recordings (Rarum VI) - The Art Ensemble of Chicago; Trumpet
- 2002 Selected Recordings (Rarum I-VIII); Trumpet
- 2002 A Little Deeper Ms. Dynamite; Horn
- 2001 FB Entertainment Presents: The Good Life; Horn
- 2000 Listening Room Jenjii; Trumpet
- 1997 Wildlife Dictionary - Garland Jeffreys; Featured Artist (Trumpet)
- 1997 Sweet Emotions - Trumpet
- 1997 Light in the Dark - 4PM (For Positive Music); Remix Vocals Arranger
- 1996 Movin' in the Right Direction - Count Basic; Trumpet
- 1995 Faith - Faith Evans; Trumpet
- 1994 My Life - Mary J. Blige; Trumpet
- 1993 The Four Horsemen - Ultramagnetic MC's; Main Personnel, Saxophone, Horn
- 1991 Bruce Purse - Bruce Purse; Primary Artist, Trumpet
- 1990 Gramavision 10th Anniversary Sampler; Trumpet
- 1989 Works - Lester Bowie; Trumpet
- 1989 Time Peace - Al MacDowell; Trumpet
- 1986 Too Strong - Lazet Michaels; Trumpet, Trumpet (Pocket)
- 1983 James White's Flaming Demonics James Chance / James White - Member of Attributed Artist; Trumpet

== Record labels ==
- CBS
- RCA
- Warner Brothers
- Atlantic Records
- Polygram
- BMG
- Purse was a staff writer for Warner Chappell Music Publishing
