= Vincent Henry =

- Born: Vincent Clyde Henry; November 1953 (age 72); New York, New York, U.S.
- Genres: Jazz, R&B
- Occupation: Multi-instrumentalist
- Instruments: Saxophone, guitar, clarinet, flute, keyboards, bass guitar, harmonica, vocals
- Years active: 1970s-present

Vincent Clyde Henry (born November 1953) is an American saxophonist and guitarist who plays jazz and R&B, and was also a member of the Italian-American post-disco group Change during the 1980s.

== Biography ==
=== Early life ===
Henry was born in New York, New York and grew up in Harlem. He started venturing out to concerts and clubs on his own when he was 14 years old.

=== Music career ===
Henry was a member of the Italian-American disco/R&B group Change from 1982 to 1985; he also played with R&B singer Johnny Kemp on his 1987 album Secrets of Flying, including taking a significant role shaping the R&B top five hit "Dancin' with Myself" (which was the follow-up to the album's massive first hit "Just Got Paid"). In 1990, Henry released his debut album Vincent, under the Jive Records label; the album also featured the single "Make It Like It Was".

Henry played and recorded music with and for several artists such as Whitney Houston, Freddie Jackson, Glenn Jones, Jonathan Butler, Will Downing, Mary J. Blige, Ice Cube, Alicia Keys, Amy Winehouse and many others.

In the summer of 2008, Henry participated in Tom Waits' Glitter and Doom Tour of the U.S. and Europe, out of which resulted the album Glitter and Doom Live. In the years that followed, Henry appeared on a few of English actor and singer Hugh Laurie's albums, and he toured all over the world with Laurie, as a regular member of The Copper Bottom Band, playing a whole range of blowing instruments including saxophones, clarinet and harmonica, ever since Laurie started touring and playing concerts as a professional blues musician.

Henry's work with Waits and Laurie was noted and highly acclaimed by the music reviews, but it was his work, and especially the extensive touring with Laurie, that finally exposed him to and got him discovered by the general audience.

In 2021, Henry took part in the creation of the soundtrack music from the motion picture The United States vs. Billie Holiday, and is credited for bass, clarinet, guitar and saxophone playing, plus horn arrangements for most of the tracks in that recording.

== Discography ==
Albums

- 1990: Vincent (Jive Records)

Singles

- 1990: "Make It Like It Was"
