= P4 =

P4 may refer to:

== Computing ==
- Intel Pentium 4, a processor series shipped from 2000 to 2008
  - The P4 power connector, introduced in the ATX12V 1.0 standard to power these and later CPUs
- The i486DX (P4) model of the Intel 80486 microprocessor, introduced in 1989
- P4 (programming language), for controlling network data forwarding
- P4, the Perforce software command line client

== Media ==
- P4 Radio Hele Norge (PFI), a Norwegian radio company
  - Kanal 24 (Kanal 4), which acquired the Norwegian P4 channel from PFI
- Sveriges Radio P4, a Swedish radio channel
- Persona 4, a 2008 video game
- Periphery IV: Hail Stan, a 2019 album by American progressive metal band Periphery
- PartyNextDoor 4, a 2024 album by Canadian singer PartyNextDoor
- Psychonaut 4, a Georgian black metal band

== Military ==
- Skaraborg Regiment (armoured), a Swedish army unit, designated P 4
- Peugeot P4, a French military vehicle

== Science ==
- P4 laboratory, a biosafety level 4 facility
- Tetraphosphorus (P_{4}), an allotrope of phosphorus
- Group p4, the plane symmetry group wallpaper group p4
- Progesterone (Pregn-4-ene-3,20-dione), a steroid hormone
- Kerberos, the fourth moon of Pluto
- Perfect fourth, a musical interval
- Enterobacteria phage P4
- P4, an EEG electrode site according to the 10-20 system
- P4 cell, a stage in the Caenorhabditis elegans embryonic development
- P4-metric, in statistics, a performance metric
- P4, three-dimensional space group number 75
- P4̅, three-dimensional space group number 81

== Roads ==
- P4 road (Latvia)
- P04 road (Ukraine)

== Other uses ==
- Papyrus 4, a New Testament manuscript
- Trans-Pacific Strategic Economic Partnership, or P4, a free trade agreement between Brunei, Chile, New Zealand, and Singapore
- Power conferences, also P4 (from "Power Four"), a grouping of NCAA Division I football conferences
- Prussian P 4, a German steam locomotive
- Protofour, or P4, a set of standards for model railways

== See also ==
- 4P (disambiguation)
- Phosphate, molecular formula PO^{3−}_{4}
- Play (telecommunications) P4, a Polish cellular telecommunications provider
