= Loudspeaker (disambiguation) =

A loudspeaker is an electroacoustic transducer that converts an electrical signal into sound.

Loudspeaker may refer to:

- A public address system
- The Loudspeaker, a 1934 American film directed by Joseph Santley
- Loudspeaker (album), a 2006 instrumental album by the guitarist Marty Friedman
- Loudspeakers (band), a Georgian rock band
- Loudspeaker (2009 film), a 2009 Indian Malayalam film directed by Jayaraj starring Mammootty
- Loudspeaker (2018 film), a 2018 Indian Kannada film
- "Loudspeaker", a song by MUNA from their 2017 album About U

== See also ==
- Audio player (disambiguation)
