= Secrets of Flying =

Studio album by Johnny Kemp
- Released: December 8, 1987
- Recorded: 1986–1987
- Genre: R&B, new jack swing, funk, soul
- Length: 65:44
- Label: Columbia
- Producer: Teddy Riley, Johnny Kemp, Morgan & Morgan, New Music Group, Bruce Purse, Vincent Henry, Eric Rehl

Johnny Kemp chronology
Johnny Kemp (1986)	Secrets of Flying (1987)

Singles from Secrets of Flying
- 1. "Just Got Paid" Released: January 19, 1988; 2. "Dancing with Myself" Released: 1988; 3. "One Thing Led to Another" Released: 1988

Professional ratings
Review scores
Source	Rating
AllMusic	link

Secrets of Flying is the second and final album released by Bahamian-American singer-songwriter Johnny Kemp. Released on December 8, 1987, the album featured two massively successful singles. The album's first hit was the Grammy-nominated single "Just Got Paid", which cracked the top 10 on the Billboard Hot 100 in 1988 and went on to top both the R&B chart and Hot Dance Music/Club Play chart. The album's second hit, "Dancin' with Myself", also became a top 5 R&B success. A third single from the album, the slow jam "One Thing Led to Another", reached the R&B top 40 as well.

In February 2012, New Skool Sounds (parent label: Funkytowngrooves) released on compact disc a digitally remastered reissue of the album as an expanded edition including four bonus tracks.

== Track listing ==
#	Title	Writer(s)	Length
1.	Just Got Paid	Gene Griffin, Johnny Kemp	5:25
2.	One Thing Led to Another	Brian Morgan, Shelley Scruggs, Tony Haynes	4:11
3.	My Only Want Is You	Fred Zarr, Jeff Smith	4:50
4.	Dancin' with Myself	Bruce Purse, Johnny Kemp, Vincent Henry	5:31
5.	Urban Times Medley	-	8:53
5a.	Inner City Blues (Make Me Wanna Holler)	Marvin Gaye, James Nyx	-
5b.	Mercy Mercy Me (Ecology)	Marvin Gaye	-
6.	Feeling Without Touching	Bruce Purse, Johnny Kemp, Vincent Henry	5:40
7.	Just Like Flyin'	Bruce Purse, Johnny Kemp, Vincent Henry	6:21
8.	+Dancin' with Myself [12" Version]	Bruce Purse, Johnny Kemp, Vincent Henry	6:02
9.	+Dancin' with Myself [Alternate Mix]	Bruce Purse, Johnny Kemp, Vincent Henry	7:22
10.	+Just Got Paid [Dub Mix]	Gene Griffin, Johnny Kemp	5:35
11.	+Just Got Paid [Instrumental]	Gene Griffin, Johnny Kemp	5:24

+: Bonus tracks on the 2012 reissued version

Notes: Track 10 mistakenly listed on release as "Just Got Paid (Instrumental)", but it is the Dub Mix version; listed correctly above. Track 11 mistakenly listed on release as "Just Got Paid (Dub Mix)", but it is the Instrumental version; listed correctly above.

== Personnel ==
"Just Got Paid"

- Johnny Kemp: Lead and Background vocals
- Teddy Riley: Synthesizers, Drum and Synthesizer programming, Bass Synthesizer, Percussion, Additional Backing vocals
- Aaron Hall: Additional Backing vocals

"One Thing Led to Another"

- Johnny Kemp: Lead and Background vocals +
- Ira Siegel: Guitar
- Brian and Shelley Morgan ("Morgan & Morgan"): All other instruments and programming
- Yogi Lee: Background vocals

"My Only Want Is You"

- Johnny Kemp: Lead vocals +
- Fred Zarr: Keyboards
- Kashif: Keyboards, Percussion
- Jeff Smith: Drum programming, Background vocals
- Darroll Gustamachio: Synclavier programming
- Yogi Lee: Background vocals

"Dancin' with Myself"

- Johnny Kemp: Lead and Background vocals, Vocal arrangements
- Vincent Henry: Synthesizers, Drum and Synthesizer programming, Guitars, Bass, Percussion, Saxophone, Synthesizer Bass
- Bruce Purse: Keyboards, Trumpet
- Eric Rehl: Synthesizers, Synthesizer programming
- Bernard Davis: Drums
- Rick Gallwey: Percussion
- Darroll Gustamachio: Synclavier programming

"Inner City Blues (Make Me Wanna Holler)"

- Johnny Kemp: Lead and Background vocals, Vocal Rap, Vocal arrangements
- Eric Rehl: Synthesizers, Drum and Synthesizer programming, Synthesizer bass
- Vincent Henry: Rhythm and Plucking Guitars
- Mike "Dino" Campbell: Rock and Picking Guitars
- Bernard Davis: Drums
- Rick Gallwey: Percussion

"Mercy Mercy Me"

- Johnny Kemp: Lead and Background vocals, Vocal arrangements
- Eric Rehl: Synthesizers, Drum and Synthesizer programming, Synthesizer bass
- Vincent Henry: Tenor, Alto, and Baritone saxophones, String and horn arrangements
- Mike "Dino" Campbell: Guitars
- Rick Gallwey: Percussion
- Bruce Purse: String and horn arrangements
- Darroll Gustamachio: Synclavier programming

"Feeling Without Touching"

- Johnny Kemp: Lead and Background vocals, Vocal arrangements
- Bruce Purse: Drum programming, Keyboards, Trumpet
- Vincent Henry: Bass, Keyboards, Saxophone
- Eric Rehl: Synthesizers, Synthesizer programming
- Rick Gallwey: Percussion
- Darroll Gustamachio: Synclavier programming
- Ivy Ray: Female speaking voice
- Kashif: Vocal arrangements

"Just Like Flyin'"

- Johnny Kemp: Lead and Background vocals, Vocal arrangements
- Bruce Purse: Keyboards, Trumpet
- Vincent Henry: Rhythm and Picking Guitars
- Andy Powell: Lead guitar
- Poogie Bell: Drums and Drum Programming, Percussion
- Alex Bugnan (sic): Keyboards
- Darroll Gustamachio: Synclavier programming
- Victor Bailey: Bass

+ Kemp is not officially credited on the album cover as the lead vocalist on "One Thing Led to Another" or "My Only Want Is You". However, given that he is the primary artist and is credited as lead vocalist on all of the other tracks, it seems like a reasonable assumption to make that he sings lead on these two as well.
