= Dress (Sophie Villy album) =

Studio album by Sophie Villy
- Released: May 27, 2014
- Recorded: by George Gvarjaladze (GVAJI)
- Studio: Georgian Film Studio (Kartuli Pilmi)
- Producers: GVAJI and Sophie Villy

Dress is the second album written and composed by Georgian musician Sophie Villy, released on May 27, 2014. Comma.com.ua ranked the album as the best Ukrainian album of the year in 2014. The Guardian named the song "Connected" as one of the six must-listen new tracks from around the world. The album was recorded and mixed by George Gvarjaladze at Georgian Film Studios in Tbilisi. It was mastered by Ron Boustead.

== Track listing ==
All tracks are written by Sophie Villy.

No.	Title	Length
1.	"Position"	3:47
2.	"Who"	3:57
3.	"I Told You"	4:01
4.	"Dude"	5:02
5.	"They Worry"	3:31
6.	"Man in the Mist"	4:22
7.	"Quiet Again"	4:36
8.	"Drift Around"	4:44
9.	"Connected"	4:07
10.	"His Grandma"	3:40
11.	"Need To Share"	2:19
12.	"Whatever"	4:30

== Personnel ==
- Sophie Villy – Vocal, Guitar, Piano, Organ
- Dima Zinchenko – Drums, Percussion, Organ
- Levan Mikaberidze – Bass
- Stas Kononov – Guitar
- Elene Jimshitashvili – Cello
- Strings – Just Quartet (GE)
- George Gabrielashvili – Trumpet
- Sound engineering – GVAJI
- Front cover photography – Sergey Sarakhanov
