= 4P =

4P, 4-P or 4.P may refer to:

== Arts and entertainment ==
- Danzig 4p, a 1994 album by heavy metal band Danzig
- 4P, the production code for the 1976 Doctor Who serial The Deadly Assassin

== Business ==
- The 4 P's or marketing mix, a tool used in marketing products

== Government and politics of the Philippines ==
- Pantawid Pamilyang Pilipino Program (4Ps)
- 4Ps Partylist, a party-list organization

== Science ==
- 4P/Faye, a periodic comet in the Solar System
- 4p, one of human chromosome 4's two arms

== See also ==
- P4 (disambiguation)
