= Glitter and Doom Live =

Live album by Tom Waits
- Released: November 23, 2009
- Recorded: 2008, Europe and the United States
- Genre: Experimental rock
- Length: 109:30
- Labels: ANTI-; Epitaph
- Producers: Kathleen Brennan, Tom Waits

Tom Waits chronology
Orphans: Brawlers, Bawlers & Bastards (2006)	Glitter and Doom Live (2009)	Bad as Me (2011)

Tom Waits live chronology
Romeo Bleeding: Live From Austin (2009)	'''Glitter and Doom Live''' (2009)

Glitter and Doom Live is a live album by Tom Waits, by the ANTI- label on November 23, 2009. The songs were recorded during the Glitter and Doom Tour of the US and Europe in the summer of 2008.

An announcement from the official site said:

Disc One is designed to sound like one evening's performance, even though the 17 tracks are selected from 10 cities, from Paris to Birmingham; Tulsa to Milan; and Atlanta to Dublin. Sonically the album is superb and has been beautifully recorded and meticulously mastered. Disc Two is a bonus compendium called TOM TALES, which is a selection of the comic bromides, strange musings, and unusual facts that Tom traditionally shares with his audience during the piano set. Waits' topics range from the ritual of insects to the last dying breath of Henry Ford.

Prior to release, ANTI- made the first eight tracks available for free download.

== Track listing ==
All tracks are written by Tom Waits and Kathleen Brennan except where noted.

Disc one
No.	Title	Recorded at	Length
1.	"Lucinda – Ain't Goin' Down" (from Orphans: Brawlers, Bawlers & Bastards, 2006)	Birmingham on 2008-07-03	5:37
2.	"Singapore" (Waits) (from Rain Dogs, 1985)	Edinburgh on 2008-07-28	5:00
3.	"Get Behind the Mule" (from Mule Variations, 1999)	Tulsa on 2008-06-25	6:26
4.	"Fannin Street" (from Orphans: Brawlers, Bawlers & Bastards)	Knoxville on 2008-06-29	4:16
5.	"Dirt in the Ground" (from Bone Machine, 1992)	Milan on 2008-07-19	5:18
6.	"Such a Scream" (Waits) (from Bone Machine)	Milan on 2008-07-18	2:54
7.	"Live Circus" (from Real Gone, 2004)	Jacksonville on 2008-07-01	5:04
8.	"Goin' Out West" (from Bone Machine)	Tulsa on 2008-06-25	3:48
9.	"Falling Down" (Waits) (from Big Time, 1988)	Paris on 2008-07-25	4:21
10.	"The Part You Throw Away" (from Blood Money, 2002)	Edinburgh on 2008-07-28	5:06
11.	"Trampled Rose" (from Real Gone)	Dublin on 2008-08-01	5:06
12.	"Metropolitan Glide" (from Real Gone)	Knoxville on 2008-06-29	3:09
13.	"I'll Shoot the Moon" (Waits) (from The Black Rider, 1993)	Paris on 2008-07-24	4:25
14.	"Green Grass" (from Real Gone)	Edinburgh on 2008-07-27	3:20
15.	"Make It Rain" (from Real Gone)	Atlanta on 2008-07-05	3:58
16.	"Story"	Columbus on 2008-06-28	2:02
17.	"Lucky Day" (Waits) (from The Black Rider)	Atlanta on 2008-07-05	3:47

Disc two
No.	Title	Length
1.	"Tom Tales" (includes "Picture in a Frame" from Mule Variations recorded at Edinburgh on 2008-07-27 as a hidden track at the end)	35:53

== Reception ==
Professional ratings
Aggregate scores
Source	Rating
Metacritic	(79/100)
Review scores
Source	Rating
AllMusic	3/5 stars
The A.V. Club	(A−)
Classic Rock	6/10 stars
Drowned in Sound	(8/10)
No Ripcord	(8/10)
Pitchfork Media	(8.0/10)
PopMatters	8/10 stars
Slant	4/5 stars

The album was released to mostly positive reviews. Drowned in Sound gave the album 8/10. Jesse Cataldo, a writer for the magazine Slant said about the album, "The set here is strange and varied, with favoritism paid to his last two albums... but no real affection for fan favorites or hits" in his 2009 review for the album.

== Personnel ==
- Tom Waits – vocals, guitar
- Seth Ford-Young – upright bass, bass guitar
- Vincent Henry – woodwinds and harmonica
- Omar Torrez – guitar, banjo
- Casey Waits – percussion
- Sullivan Waits – clarinet
- Patrick Warren – keyboard

== Chart positions ==
Chart (2009)	Peak position
Austrian Top 40	30
Belgian Albums Chart (Vl)	29
Dutch Top 100	36
French SNEP Albums Chart	91
German Albums Chart	61
Irish Albums Chart	44
Norwegian Albums Chart	5
Spanish Albums Chart	53
Swedish Albums Chart	46
Swiss Hitparade Top 100	47
UK Albums Chart	76
US Billboard 200	63
US Billboard Independent Albums	4
US Billboard Rock Albums	15
