= Prague Ratter =

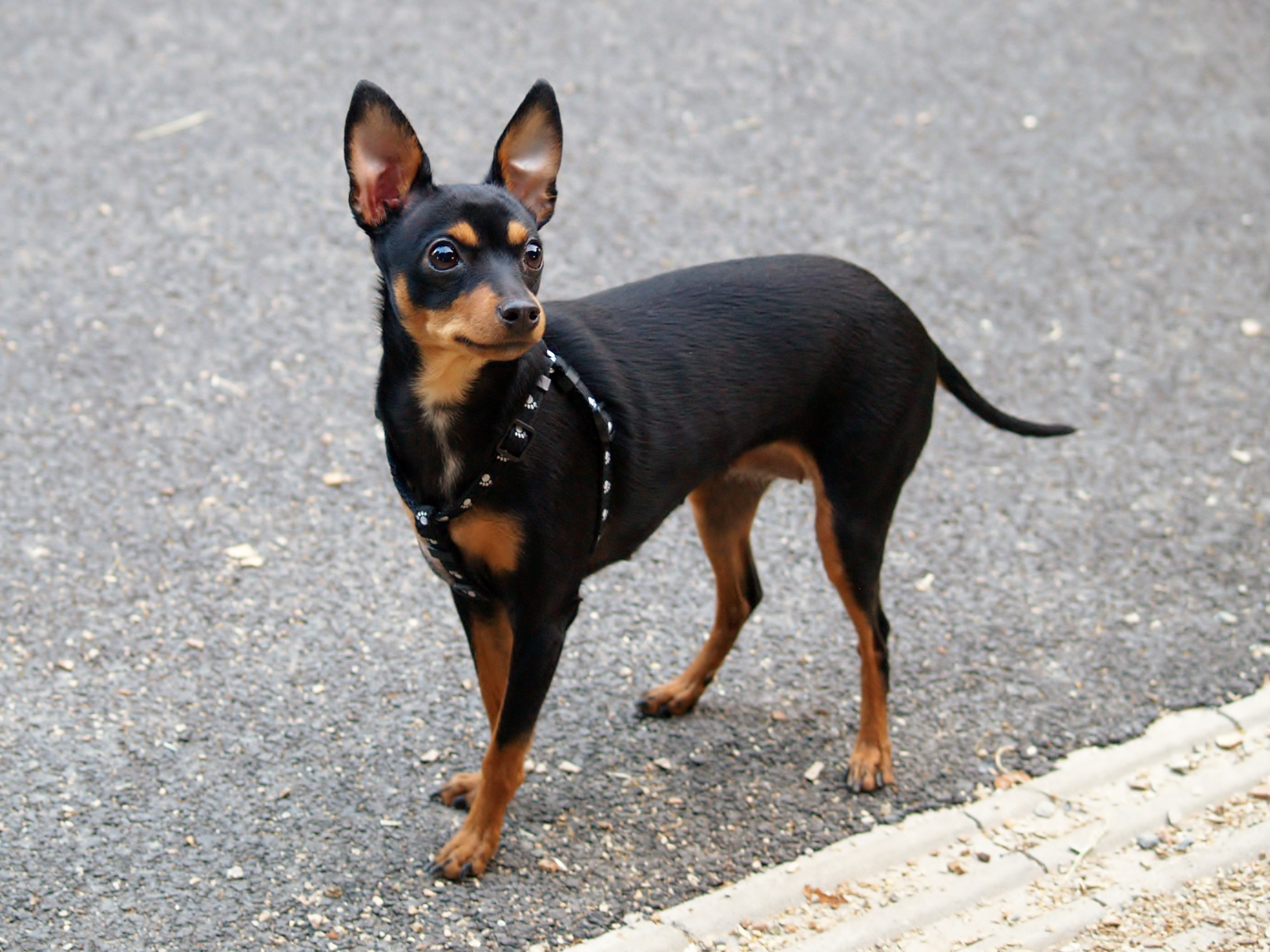
- Prague Ratter
- Other names: Pražský Krysařík
- Common nicknames: Prazsky, PK
- Origin: Czech Republic
Traits
- Height: 20–23 cm (7.9–9.1 in)
- Weight: 1.5–3.5 kg (3.3–7.7 lb)
- Coat: short, smooth and glossy long and fringed
- Colour: black and tan, brown and tan, blue and tan, lilac and tan, fawn, red, pink, merle
- Litter size: 1-3
Kennel club standards
- Czech Kennel Club: standard
- Fédération Cynologique Internationale: standard

The Prague Ratter (Czech: Pražský Krysařík) is a small breed of dog from the Czech Republic that is rarely seen outside its country of origin.

== Description ==
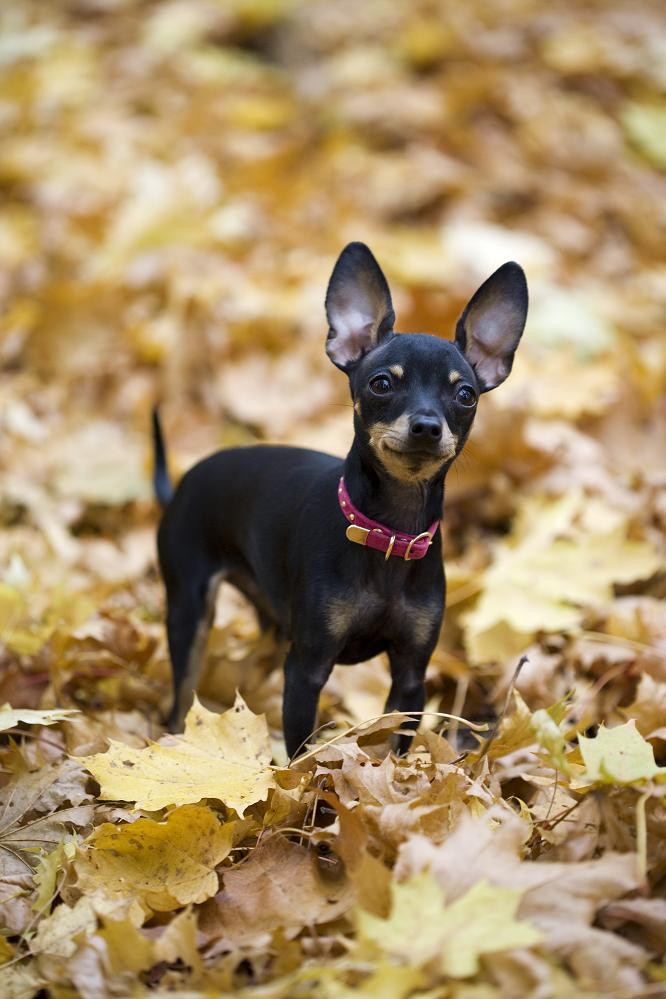
Female Prague Ratter

=== Appearance ===
The Prague Ratter is a small toy dog, similar in appearance to the Chihuahua and the Miniature Pinscher, with a height of 20 to 23 centimetres (7.9 to 9.1 in) and a weight of 1.5 to 3.5 kilograms (3.3 to 7.7 lb).

There are two coat variations:

- short: smooth, glossy and thick
- long: fringes on ears, limbs and tail

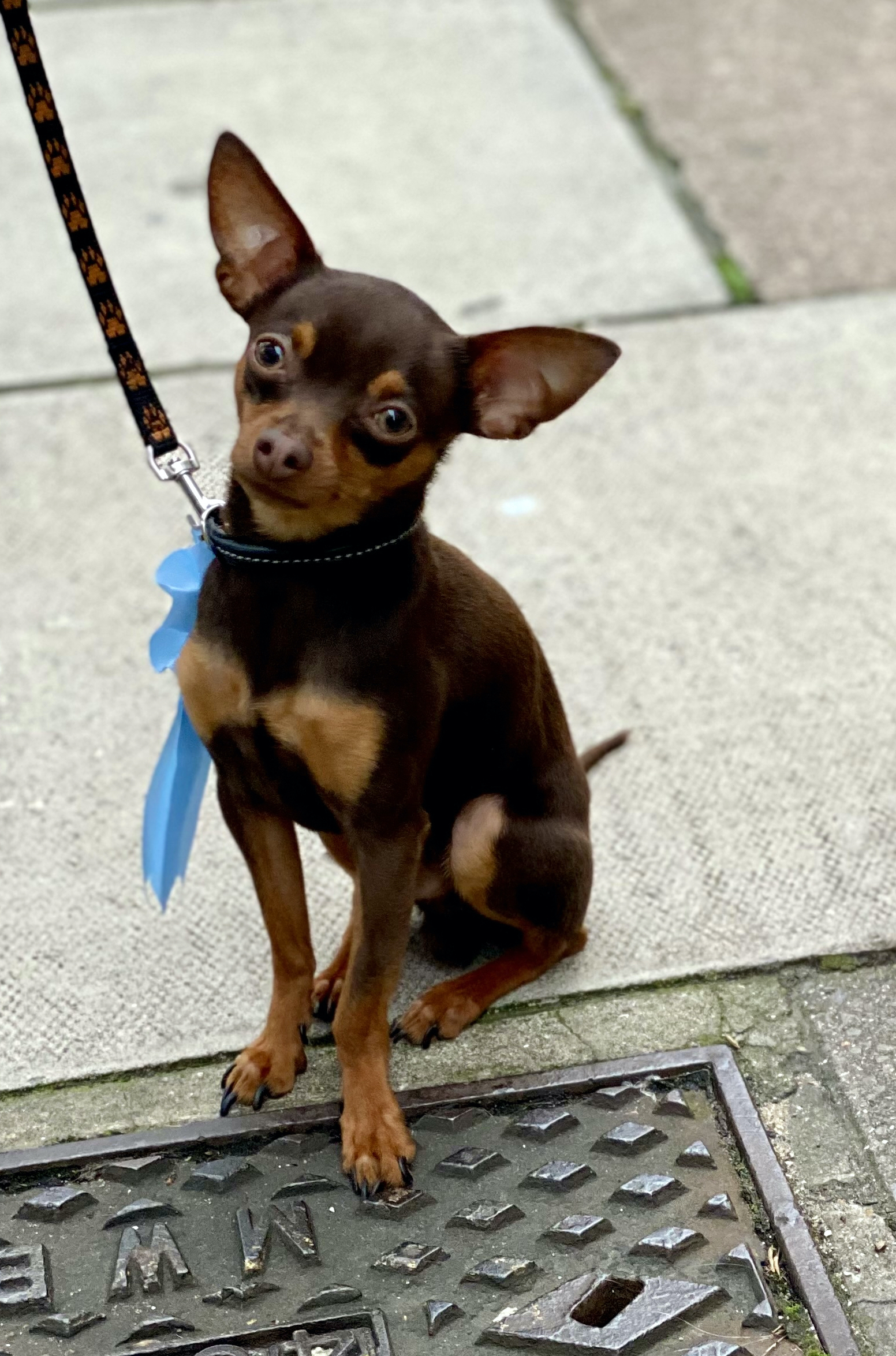
A brown and tan Prague Ratter male

The most common color is black and tan, which is also the original color. Lately, other colors have been approved: brown and tan, blue and tan, lilac and tan, yellow, pink, red, and merle.

=== Temperament ===
Best known for its lively nature, the Prague Ratter is a spunky breed that is full of original character. They thrive on strong, dependable relationships with humans, love affection and play the role of lap dog during down time. This breed is highly intelligent and responds well to basic training and commands. As a pet, the Prague Ratter is obedient, loyal, and affectionate. The Prague Ratter adapts well to full-time indoor and apartment living, but still enjoys spending time outdoors, playing games like fetch, and taking long walks. They are known to be quiet, unlike other small dog breeds who may be described as "yappy".

=== Train-ability ===
Due to its need for human attention and eagerness to please its owner, the Prague Ratter generally responds well to basic training and commands. This breed has the ability to learn to perform many tricks and tasks. Many owners claim that these dogs can easily be taught to use a litter box, thus eliminating the need for constant trips outdoors.

Establishing immediate trust and respect is key to successfully training the Prague Ratter. These dogs can sometimes be somewhat sensitive to criticism and in most cases respond best to positive reinforcement and reward-based training.

=== Areas of use ===
The Prague Ratter can be trained for agility, freestyle, obedience, tracking etc.

The sense of smell and hearing is highly developed. They have a high prey drive and will readily go after squirrels, rats and mice.

== History ==
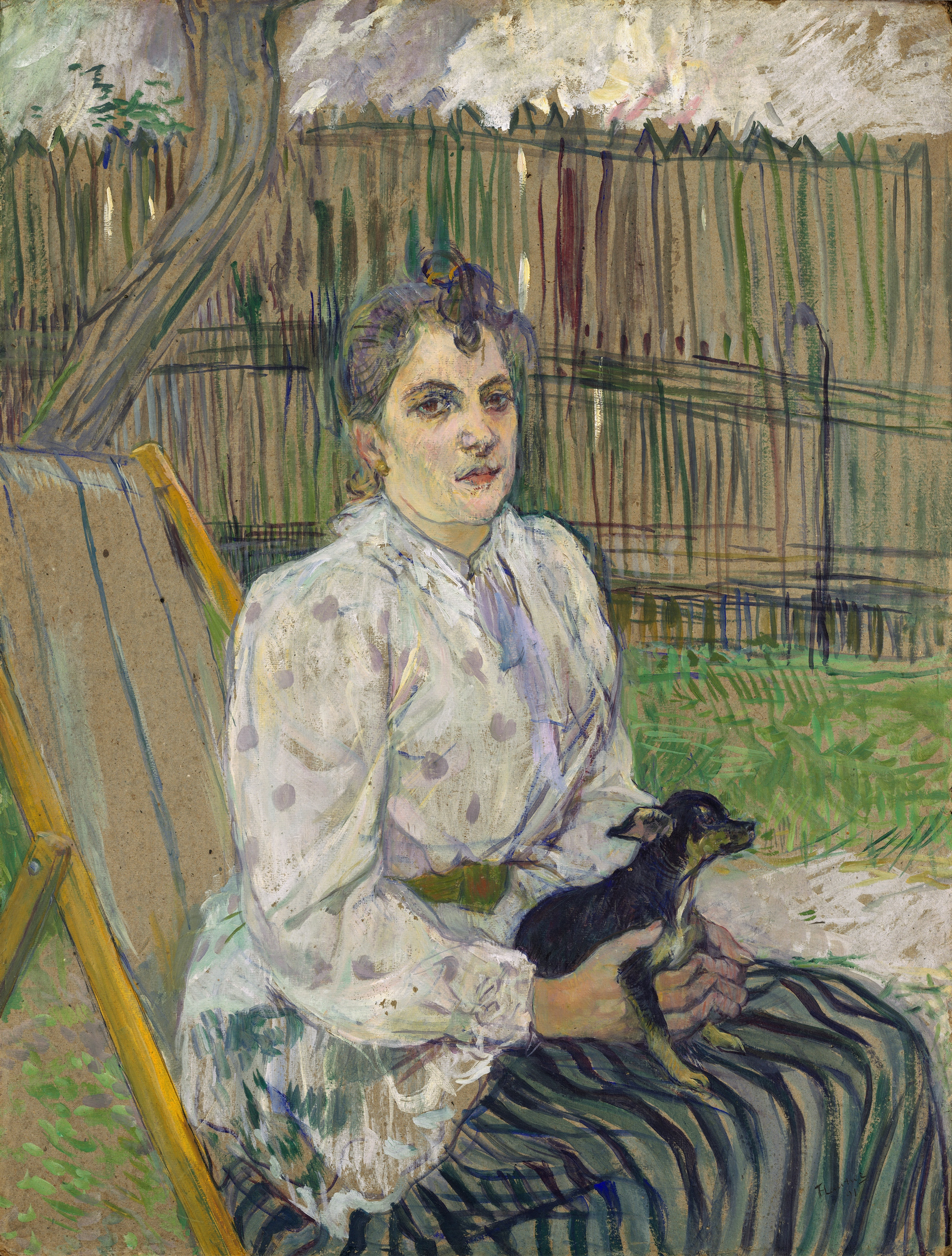
Henri de Toulouse-Lautrec (1864–1901). Lady with a Dog

Czech dog breeders claim that krysaříks (ratters) are one of the oldest Czech breeds. The first mentions of these ratter dogs are found in the writings of the historian Einhard, dating back to the 8th-9th centuries. The Polish historian Gallus Anonymus mentions the beloved ratters of King Bolesław II the Generous (1058–1081). He became fond of the ratter and had two of them imported to Poland from Bohemia. As their name suggests they were also commonly used as rat catchers in rural and urban households. Ratters are even mentioned in the writings of Jules Michelet: Charles IV of Luxembourg, during his visit to France in 1377, presented three ratters to King Charles V of France as a precious gift, and later they were inherited by his son the Dauphin. In historical chronicles and literary works, ratters are mentioned in connection with Wenceslaus IV, Rudolf II and other European rulers.

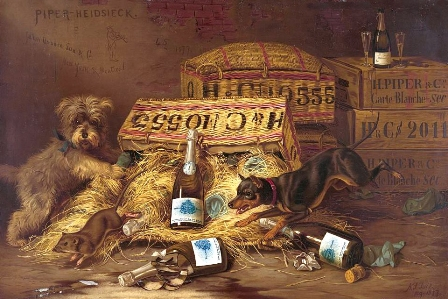
Postcard: Two dogs Chasing a Mouse by A.F. Tait

In the era of the absence of cats in Europe, small rat terriers, along with other rat-catchers, served to protect the property of the royal owners from rodents. Legends say that in the royal houses Prague Ratters were also obliged to protect the owners from poisoners: during meals they were allowed to walk on tables and taste food and drinks. With the decline of the Czech state, Prague Ratters lost their exclusive belonging to the noble houses. They could be seen in peasant and bourgeois dwellings and outbuildings. They were used in rat battles popular in Europe. And over time they took their deserved place in the salons of ladies, as pets and companions.

The popularity of the Prague Ratters started to decline in the 19th century when the Miniature Pinscher became more fashionable. The breed went through a renaissance in the 1980s as Czechs and Slovaks started to breed them again. The first stage of the revival of the breed and the compilation of stud books began at the end of the 19th century under the leadership of dog breeders T. Rotter and O. Karlik. Two World Wars and the period of the communist regime in Czechoslovakia nullified the results of their efforts, the stud books were lost.

Modern Prague Ratters trace their history since the 70s of the XX century, the key role in the revival of the breed was played by the canine scientists Jan Findejs, Rudolf Šiler, (1909–1997). In 1980, the first Prague Ratters was registered in the studbook.

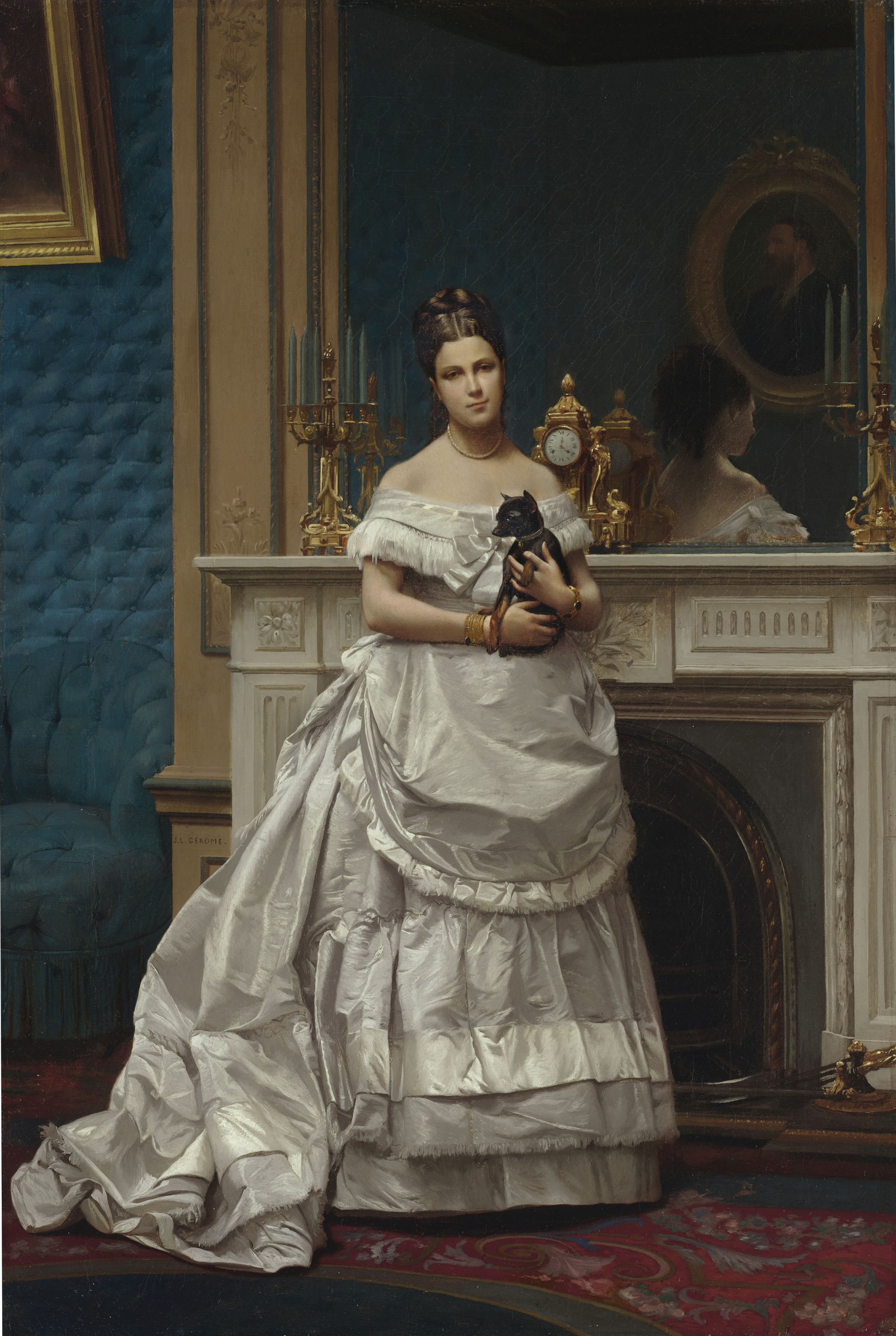
Jean Leon Jerome, Portrait of Mary Jerome

Until the end of the 20th century, the breed existed and developed exclusively within the borders of the Czech Republic and Slovakia. By the second decade of the 21st century, several hundred Prague Ratters live outside the Czech Republic. Breed clubs have been established in several countries. In addition to the countries of Western Europe and Scandinavia, Prague Ratters live in Russia, USA, Australia, and Japan. There is a small number of Prague Ratters in Ukraine, Kazakhstan and Italy.

In 2019, it became an FCI acknowledged breed. There are only about 6,000 Prague Ratters registered in the world and they usually only have 1-3 puppies per year. They are nevertheless presented at shows in the Czech Republic, Slovakia, and Scandinavia.

== Health ==
It is believed that the Prague Ratters is one of the dog breeds that do not have significant health problems. However, they can be prone to:

- Diseases of the teeth and gums. Prague Ratters are prone to increased formation of tartar, which leads to bad breath, as well as the development of periodontitis. Prevention consists of regularly brushing teeth and removing plaque when visiting your veterinarian. Prague Ratters can also have retained baby teeth, which may need to be pulled to prevent further problems with dentition.
- Bone injuries due to their small size. The most common fractures are the bones of the metacarpus and forearm.
- Patellar luxation, an ailment common to small breeds. It is believed that this defect is congenital and inherited.
- Different kind of gastrointestinal problems are common.

=== Life expectancy ===
The Prague Ratter has a life span of 12 to 14 years.

== See also ==
- List of dog breeds
