= Planet A =

Planet A Ventures
- Type: Private
- Industry: Venture capital
- Founded: 2020; 6 years ago in Germany
- Founders: Nick de la Forge; Fridtjof Detzner; Lena Thiede; Tobias Seikel; Christian Schad; Christoph Gras
- Headquarters: Berlin, Germany
- Products: Venture capital fund (€160 million Fund I)

Planet A is a German venture capital firm based in Berlin that invests in early-stage European deep-tech companies.

The firm focuses on areas such as neo manufacturing, energy, resource mastery and critical infrastructure. It has described itself as the first European venture capital fund to make a scientific impact assessment a required part of every investment decision.

== History ==
Planet A was founded in 2020 by a group of entrepreneurs, investors and environmental experts. The five founding partners were Nick de la Forge, Fridtjof Detzner, Lena Thiede, Tobias Seikel and Christian Schad. Christoph Gras joined later as the firm’s General Partner.

On 8 February 2023, the firm closed its first fund at €160 million, above its original target of €100 million. Investors in the fund included the carmaker BMW, the German development bank KfW Capital, multinational financial services Allianz, the retailer REWE, and the Danish state investment fund EIFO. Several entrepreneurs also invested, including Rolf Schrömgens of Trivago, Maximilian Backhaus of HelloFresh, and Rubin Ritter of Zalando. At the time of the fund's close, Planet A had already made 14 investments. In 2023, founding partner Fridtjof Detzner was named Investor of the Year at the German Startup Awards.

By late 2025, partners at Planet A had become commentators on the state of European climate investing.

== Investment approach ==
Planet A is the first European venture capital firm to operate an in-house science team. Before investing, the team carries out impact assessments such as life-cycle assessments, a method that measures the environmental effects of a product or technology across its entire life, from raw materials and supply chains through to disposal. The firm spends roughly 100–200 hours on this analysis for each prospective investment and publishes the resulting assessments publicly. It invests only in companies that can demonstrate a significant, measurable positive impact in at least one of its four focus areas.

The firm invests mainly at the early stages, from pre-seed to Series A, with initial investments typically ranging from about €500,000 to €5 million. It backs both hardware and software companies, in sectors such as agriculture and food, energy, manufacturing, transport, construction, and waste management.

== Investments ==
By 2026, Planet A invested in 40 companies, depending on the source. Notable portfolio companies and funding rounds include:

- Traceless Materials – a Hamburg company developing a compostable, plastic-free material; raised €36.6 million in 2023.
- Makersite – a product-sustainability software company that raised €60 million in 2025.
- Hived – a British electric parcel-delivery startup that raised $42 million in 2025.
- Arsenale Bioyards – a biomanufacturing company that raised €9.5 million in 2025.
- Optiml – a real-estate software (proptech) startup that raised $8 million.
- Aris Machina – an artificial intelligence manufacturing startup led by a former Northvolt chief executive.
- Gigaton – an autonomous industrial-control company that raised $26 million in 2026.
