= Glitter and Doom Tour =

2008 concert tour by Tom Waits

- Tour by Tom Waits
- Official tour poster
- Location: North America; Europe
- Start date: June 17, 2008
- End date: August 1, 2008
- Legs: 2
- No. of shows: 28

Tom Waits concert chronology
- The Orphans Tour (2006); Glitter and Doom Tour (2008); ...

The Glitter and Doom Tour was a concert tour by American rock musician Tom Waits from June to August 2008. The tour is the last he has given to date. The tour was recorded and a selection of live performances of songs from the tour were included on a live album called Glitter and Doom Live which was released the following year.

== Background ==
The tour was announced at a performance art press conference on May 5, 2008. Anti records also released an article to NPR which had Tom interviewing himself.

== Tickets ==
Tickets for Waits' summer shows were limited to two per person but, in an effort to beat ticket touts, a valid I.D. (passport or driving license) matching the name on the ticket was required to gain entry. Any concert-goer who did not have a valid I.D. or was found to be in possession of a ticket that had been resold was not allowed in and did not get a refund.

== Band ==
As of July 22 Tom Waits band consisted of the following:

- Vincent Henry – woodwinds
- Casey Waits – drums
- Omar Torrez – guitar/banjo
- Patrick Warren – keyboard
- Seth Ford-Young – bass
- Sullivan Waits – clarinet/conga

== Tour dates ==
Date	City	State	Venue
North America
June 17, 2008	Phoenix	United States	Orpheum Theatre
June 18, 2008	Phoenix	United States	Orpheum Theatre
June 20, 2008	El Paso	United States	Plaza Theatre
June 22, 2008	Houston	United States	Jones Hall
June 23, 2008	Dallas	United States	Palladium Ballroom
June 25, 2008	Tulsa	United States	Brady Theater
June 26, 2008	St. Louis	United States	Fox Theatre
June 28, 2008	Columbus	United States	Ohio Theatre
June 29, 2008	Knoxville	United States	Civic Theatre
July 1, 2008	Jacksonville	United States	Times-Union Center for the Performing Arts
July 2, 2008	Mobile	United States	Saenger Theatre
July 3, 2008	Birmingham	United States	Alabama Theatre
July 5, 2008	Atlanta	United States	Fox Theatre
Europe
July 12, 2008	San Sebastián	Spain	Auditorium Kursaal
July 14, 2008	Barcelona	Spain	Auditorium Forum
July 15, 2008	Barcelona	Spain	Auditorium Forum
July 17, 2008	Milan	Italy	Teatro degli Arcimboldi
July 18, 2008	Milan	Italy	Teatro degli Arcimboldi
July 19, 2008	Milan	Italy	Teatro degli Arcimboldi
July 21, 2008	Prague	Czech Republic	Kongresové Centrum Praha
July 22, 2008	Prague	Czech Republic	Kongresové Centrum Praha
July 24, 2008	Paris	France	Le Grand Rex
July 25, 2008	Paris	France	Le Grand Rex
July 27, 2008	Edinburgh	United Kingdom	Edinburgh Playhouse
July 28, 2008	Edinburgh	United Kingdom	Edinburgh Playhouse
July 30, 2008	Dublin	Ireland	Phoenix Park
July 31, 2008	Dublin	Ireland	Phoenix Park
August 1, 2008	Dublin	Ireland	Phoenix Park
