= Johnny Kemp (album) =

Studio album by Johnny Kemp
- Released: 1986
- Recorded: 1984–1986
- Genre: R&B
- Label: Columbia
- Producers: Jeff Smith, Brian Morgan, Shelley Scruggs

Johnny Kemp chronology
Johnny Kemp (1986)	Secrets of Flying (1987)

Professional ratings
Review scores
Source	Rating
AllMusic	link

Johnny Kemp is the self-titled debut studio album by American recording artist Johnny Kemp. The first hit from the album was the single "Just Another Lover". The album also includes the hits "Cover Girl", "Penthouse Lover", and "Can't Get Enough". This album was digitally remastered first by Blue Bird Records in 2007 and recently by Funky Town Grooves in 2013, including eight additional bonus tracks, mainly remixes and instrumental versions.

== Track listing ==
#	Title	Writer(s)	Length
1.	"Just Another Lover"	Kashif, Jeff Smith	4:41
2.	"Can't Get Enough"	Brian Morgan, Kashif, Shelley Scruggs, Jeff Smith	4:15
3.	"Anything Worth Having (Is Worth Waiting For)"	Andre Lea, Brian Morgan, Shelley Scruggs	5:34
4.	"Lady in the Shadow"	Brian Morgan, Johnny Kemp, Shelley Scruggs	4:30
5.	"Bring Your Love Around"	Johnny Kemp, Jeff Smith	4:20
6.	"Cover Girl"	Howard King, Kevin Grady, Kevin Robinson	5:50
7.	"All Night"	Peter Lord, Jeff Smith	4:30
8.	"Penthouse Lover"	Brian Morgan, Johnny Kemp, Shelley Scruggs	4:11
