= Soft Eject =

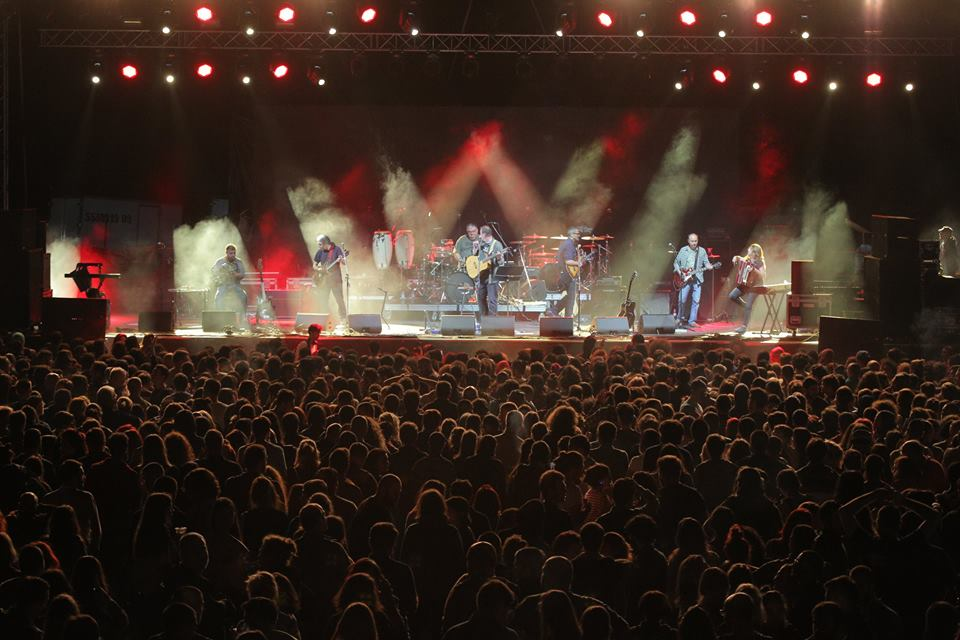
- Soft Eject performing at Tbilisi Open Air 2017

Background information
- Origin: Tbilisi, Georgia
- Genres: Indie rock, folk rock
- Years active: 1990-2004; 2017-present
- Website: facebook.com/softeject

Soft Eject is a Georgian indie rock band. Their musical style is influenced by folk rock and traditional folk music. Soft Eject was formed by singer-songwriter friends Pecho Chelishvili, Vaho Babunashvili, Otar Karalashvili and Gia Karchkhadze, with Nodar Manchkhashvili on the drums. The band first performed live in 1990. Their unique style of music and exclusively English lyrics brought them popularity from the very beginning in 90’s Georgia.

== Career ==
=== 1990 - 1996: Wandering ===
The band's formation years coincided with dramatic political changes, such as the collapse of the Soviet Union, emergence of Georgia as an independent country, and civil wars. In 1992 Soft Eject fled to Germany, where busking led to gigs in local bars, then to clubs and concert houses. This wandering, bohemian lifestyle served as an inspiration for their first album Wanderer, where lyrics talk about freedom, traveling and the many discoveries of life.

In 1993 Otar Karalashvili left the band. In 1994 Soft Eject made several top quality recordings in Germany, among them their number one hit Please Just Carry on. A video was made for the single in 1995 and it remains one of the most recognizable music videos in Georgia.

At the end of 1995 Soft Eject returned home after their 4 years of wandering. From 1996 the band continued working in Georgia, creating their own recording studio and taking up several experimental projects. At the end of 1996 Pecho left Soft Eject.

=== 1997-2004: Studio days ===
The band developed their unique style by researching folklore and classical music and incorporated various instruments while recording compositions. Four musicians were invited to join the band: Sandro Nikoladze (flute), Emzar Burduli (French horn), Ana Sikharulidze (accordion) and Giorgi Kobakhidze (guitar). This new 7-member band achieved a natural high quality live sound. During 1999-2001 Soft Eject developed many experimental pieces, among them folk orientated projects "Night" and "Nine Mountains Away". In 2002 the band performed at "In The City" festival in Manchester, that led to their 2003 tour in the UK.

In 2002 Gia Karchkhadze left the band. Soft Eject stopped working two years afterwards.

=== 2016-present ===
After 12 years of hiatus, the four core members - Pecho Chelishvili, Vaho Babunashvili, Gia Karchkhadze and Nodar Manchkhashvili, started to work together again on new material, and as in good old days, they made their own recording studio. They were soon offered to play at Tbilisi Open Air Festival in 2017. Soft Eject’s comeback performance on 17 June was a huge success. The band decided to record a new album, consisting of original compositions written in early days of their carrier. According to the band "these are the songs that they couldn't overcome when they were much younger". The album, called "Connecting Times", was released on 12 May 2020.

== Discography ==
- Wanderer – 2001
- Night - 2002
- Nine Mountains Away – 2003
- Connecting Times – 2020
