= Romeo Bleeding: Live from Austin =

Live album by Tom Waits
- Released: 2009
- Recorded: December 5, 1978
- Genre: Blues rock
- Length: 52:03
- Label: Immortal/IMC Music Ltd.

Tom Waits live chronology
Big Time (1988)	Romeo Bleeding: Live from Austin (2009)	Glitter and Doom Live (2009)

Romeo Bleeding: Live from Austin is a live album by Tom Waits, first released in 2009 on Immortal/IMC Music Ltd. The album was recorded on December 5, 1978 in Austin, Texas. This album is not approved by the artist.

== Track listing ==
All compositions by Tom Waits, except where noted.

No.	Title	Writer(s)	Length
1.	"Summertime* / Burma Shave"	*George Gershwin, Ira Gershwin, DuBose Heyward	11:16
2.	"Annie's Back in Town / I Wish I Was in New Orleans / Ain't Gonna Rain*"	*Traditional	7:28
3.	"A Sweet Little Bullet from a Pretty Blue Gun"		7:42
4.	"On the Nickel"		6:10
5.	"Romeo Is Bleeding"		4:59
6.	"Silent Night* / Christmas Card from a Hooker in Minneapolis"	*Franz Gruber, Joseph Mohr	5:51
7.	"Small Change / Hey Big Spender / Small Change (reprise)"	*Cy Coleman, Dorothy Fields	8:37

== Personnel ==
- Tom Waits - vocals, piano
- Herbert Hardesty - saxophone, trumpet, flugelhorn
- Arthur Richardson - guitar
- John Thomassie - drums
- Greg Cohen - bass guitar
