= Just Got Paid (Johnny Kemp song) =

Single by Johnny Kemp

from the album Secrets of Flying
- Released: January 19, 1988
- Genre: New jack swing
- Length: 5:32
- Label: Columbia
- Songwriters: Gene Griffin; Johnny Kemp
- Producers: Teddy Riley; Johnny Kemp

Johnny Kemp singles chronology
"Anything Worth Having (Is Worth Waiting For)" (1986)	"Just Got Paid" (1988)	"Dancin' with Myself" (1988)

"Just Got Paid" is a song recorded by Bahamian R&B singer–songwriter, Johnny Kemp. It was released on January 19, 1988, by Columbia Records, as the lead single from his second and last studio album, Secrets of Flying (1987).

== Background ==
The song started as an instrumental track by Teddy Riley intended for Keith Sweat's 1987 debut Make It Last Forever, but Sweat ultimately passed on the song. Kemp then recorded a demo of the song, intending for it to be used by another singer; his scratch vocal ended up on the final release.

== Chart performance ==
The song hit No. 1 on the U.S. R&B and Dance charts and reached No. 10 on the Billboard Hot 100.

== Accolades ==
"Just Got Paid" received a Grammy Award nomination for Best R&B Song at the 31st Grammy Awards in 1989, losing to Anita Baker's "Giving You the Best That I Got".

== Covers and sampling ==
- The song was covered by NSYNC on their album No Strings Attached (2000), which was also produced by the song's original producer Teddy Riley.
- The song was covered by CDB on their 2017 album Tailored for Now.
- It was sampled by Kurupt on the song "At It Again" off his Space Boogie: Smoke Oddessey album.

== In popular culture ==
- The song was used in the 2000 romantic film Love & Basketball.
- Kemp performed "Just Got Paid" in an "all-star finale" on Keith Sweat's 2007 DVD Sweat Hotel Live.

== Charts ==
=== Weekly charts ===
Chart (1988)	Peak position
Belgium (Ultratop 50 Flanders)	22
Canada Top Singles (RPM)	57
Netherlands (Dutch Top 40)	19
Netherlands (Single Top 100)	12
New Zealand (Recorded Music NZ)	45
US Billboard Hot 100	10
US Hot R&B/Hip-Hop Songs (Billboard)	1
US Dance Club Songs (Billboard)	1

=== Year-end charts ===
Chart (1988)	Position
Canada Dance/Urban (RPM)	22
