= Loudspeakers (band) =

LOUDspeakers
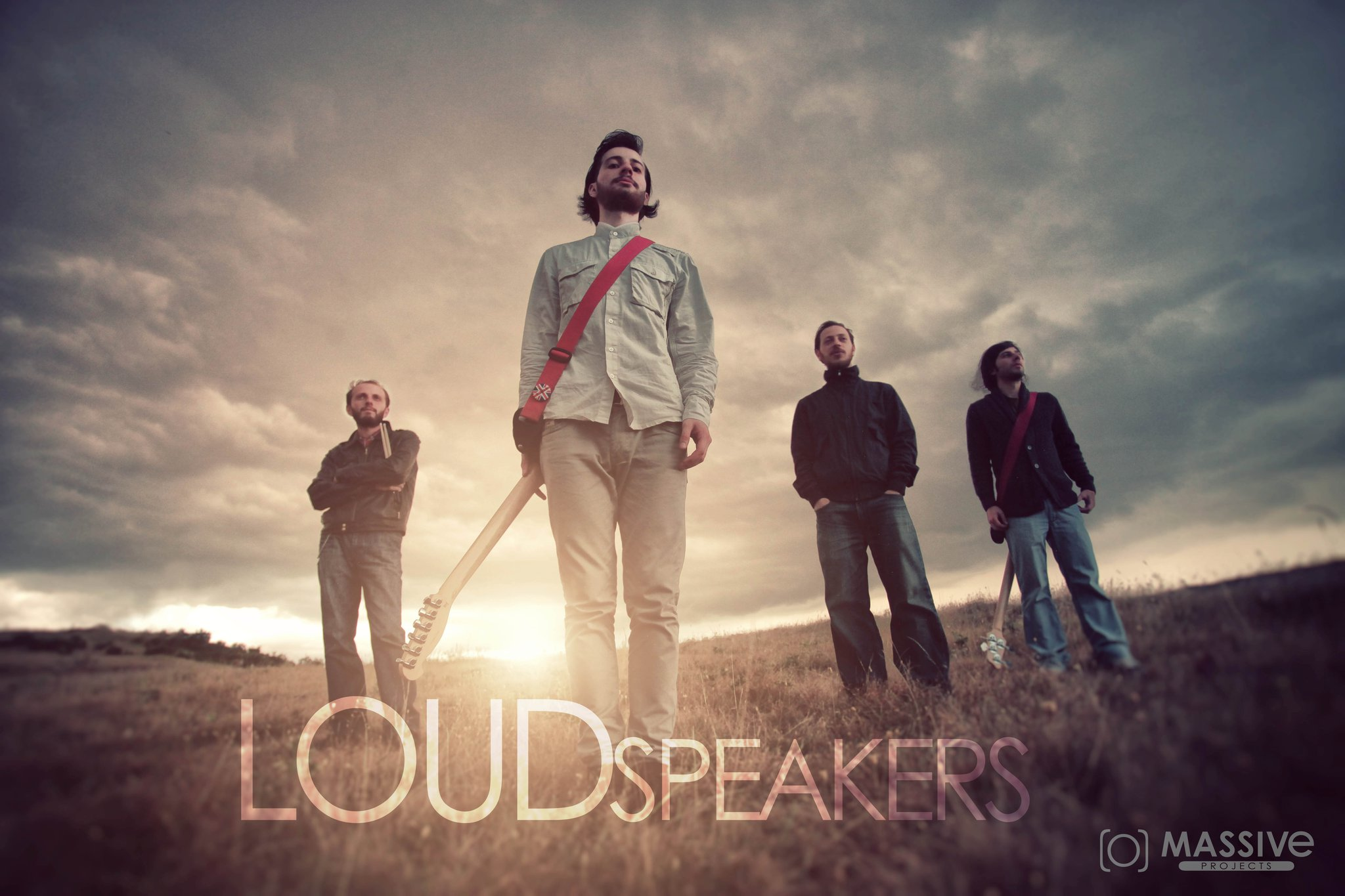

Background information
- Origin: Georgia
- Genres: Alternative rock, indie rock
- Years active: 2009–present
- Members: Levan Loudadze; Sandro Tsiklauri; Levan Mamaladze; Giorgi Tetso
- Past members: Aleko Dolidze otar gurgenidze Zura Mchedlishvili; Dato Tsomaia
- Website: Myspace

Loudspeakers (stylised as LOUDspeakers) is a Georgian rock band formed in 2009.

== History ==
Loudspeakers formed in 2009 as an alternative rock band. In that year, the band recorded their first song in the Kote Kalandadze studio. In January 2010 they played their songs in Tbilisi rock club. In 2010 Otar Gurgenidze left the band, Zura Mchedlishvili replaced him. The same time Zura left and Dato Tsomaia joined the band.

The first important success of this band was when they played in Tbilisi Altervision-Newcomers and won the contest. In 2011 the band had the first solo concert in Magti Club. After this concert Aleko Dolidze left the band. It was an important loss but LoudSpeakers didn't stop their work and Sandro Tsiklauri joined the band.

By today LoudSpeakers have played in festivals in Georgia and other countries around the world. For example, Tbilisi Open Air and Arenal Sound Festival.

The band released their debut album, Lighthouse, on 4 March 2015.

== Band members ==
Current members

- Levan Loudadze – Lead Vocals and guitars (2009–present)
- Levan Mamaladze – Bass Guitar (2009–present)
- Sandro Tsiklauri – Keyboards (2011–present)

Former members

- Aleko Dolidze – Keyboards (2009–2011)
- Otar Gurgenidze – Drums (2009–2010)
- Zura Mchedlishvili - Drums (2010)
- Dato Tsomaia - Drums (2010-2017)
- Giorgi Tetso - Drums (201?-201?)

== Discography ==
Albums

- Lighthouse (2015)

Singles

- In This World (2009)
- World In My Eyes (2010)
- Fallen In You (2011)
- Old Dreamer (2012)
- Lighthouse (2014)
- Between Two Ways (2018)
