= Omar Torrez =

American guitarist

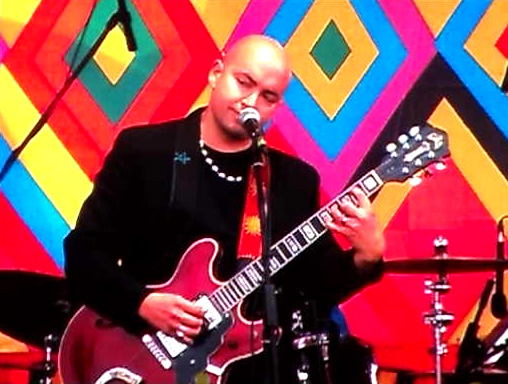
Omar Torres in Perm 02 June 2012

Omar Torrez is an American guitarist from Los Angeles, California. Born and raised in Seattle, Washington, Torrez first received national attention as finalist in the National Jimi Hendrix Guitar Competition at the Bumbershoot Festival. He studied classical guitar at Western Washington University. He studied Flamenco guitar under Juan Serrano and studied with Miroslav Tadic for his MFA. He is a member of the guitar faculty at The California Institute of the Arts.

Tom Waits chose Torrez as his guitarist for the 2008 Glitter and Doom Tour. He is featured on Tom Waits' Glitter and Doom Live record on ANTI- label and on the Glitter and Doom Atlanta live recording broadcast on NPR. He began collaborating with Russian songwriter, Boris Grebenshchikov, first playing together in Budva Montenegro, and Israel. He was the featured soloist on Boris Grebenschikov’s song, Не Судьба.

Torrez has also toured extensively around the world and played with Kinky, the Buena Vista Social Club, Jethro Tull, Mumiy Troll, and Ximena Sariñana, and has played at the Festival Internacional Cervantino. As a Fulbright Scholarship recipient the artist performed to the benefit of children displaced by the 2008 conflict between Republic of Georgia and the Russian Federation.

In 2012, Torrez's song "Marina" from A Night of Serious Drinking won third place in the International Songwriting Competition in the Latin category. "Burn It Down" won "Honorable Mention" in the Rock category of the International Songwriting Competition.

The latest Omar Torrez album A Night of Serious Drinking was released in Mexico by Discos Intolerancia. The record premier was at Festival Vive Latino in Mexico City on March 14, 2015.
