= Johnny Kemp =

Bahamian singer and songwriter (1959–2015)

Background information
- Born: Jonathan Kemp; August 2, 1959; Nassau, Bahamas
- Died: April 16, 2015 (aged 55) Montego Bay, Jamaica
- Genres: R&B, new jack swing
- Occupations: Singer, songwriter, producer
- Instruments: Vocals, keyboards, bass synthesizer
- Years active: 1979–2015
- Label: Columbia

Jonathan "Johnny" Kemp (August 2, 1959 – April 16, 2015) was a Bahamian singer, songwriter, and record producer. He began his career as a songwriter in late 1979 and is perhaps best known for his solo work, including his single "Just Got Paid" (1988), which was nominated for a Grammy Award for Best R&B Song in 1989.

== Biography ==
=== Early life and career ===
Kemp began singing in nightclubs in the Bahamas at age 13. He moved to Harlem, New York in 1979 with the band Kinky Fox. In the early 1980s, Kemp became a successful session musician and songwriter, singing backup for the B. B. & Q. Band on their 1982 album All Night Long (on which he co-wrote several tracks) and for Change on their 1982 album Sharing Your Love (on which he co-wrote "Take You To Heaven"). He also appeared on the obscure Network LP I Need You in 1984, where he had lead vocals on the song "Cover Girl", later re-recorded for his self-titled debut solo album.

=== Solo career ===
Kemp landed a solo recording contract with Columbia Records and released his eponymous debut album in 1986. It charted in the U.S. on Billboard's Top Black Albums chart, reaching No. 36 on June 28 of that year. He scored a minor hit single from the album with "Just Another Lover" (co-written by Kashif), which peaked at No. 14 Billboard's Hot Black Singles chart on June 21, 1986 and hit the Hot Dance/Disco charts, reaching No. 26 in Club Play and No. 35 in 12 Inch Singles Sales that same month.

Greater success came the following year with the release of his Secrets of Flying (1987) album, which contained a pair of Top 5 hits on Billboard′s Hot Black Singles chart, "Dancin' with Myself" and "Just Got Paid", the latter hitting No. 1. "Just Got Paid" hit No. 10 on the Billboard Hot 100 in the summer of 1988, and sold over a million singles in the United States. It topped the Hot Dance Music/Club Play and provided his only UK Singles Chart entry, peaking at No. 68 in August 1988. His only other Hot 100 entry was "Birthday Suit", a tune from the soundtrack to the movie, Sing (1989), which climbed to No. 36 in 1989.

=== Later career ===
Kemp appeared on Keith Sweat's DVD release, Sweat Hotel Live (2007), which featured live performances by Sweat in a sort of reunion with other R&B/new jack swing era pioneers of the late 1980s, including Teddy Riley. Kemp appeared on the final track, an "all-star finale" rendition of "Just Got Paid", originally recorded at a February 2006 concert in Atlanta, Georgia. Incidentally, Sweat had initially passed on the instrumental track that would eventually become "Just Got Paid", when it was first offered to him in the mid-1980s. Kemp listened to it, added his own lyrics to the melody, and "Just Got Paid" was born. Kemp also performed a version of the Reading Rainbow theme song (and other songs for that series) that was broadcast on PBS for a few years between the Tina Fabrique and Chaka Khan versions. Kemp was the featured performer (singing "Just Got Paid") at the NJS4E event in New York City, on September 8, 2007. As the name implied, the show celebrated and commemorated 20 years of new jack swing and took place at Ashford & Simpson's Sugar Bar. In the 90s Johnny Kemp and Sherry Goffin Kondor, the daughter of Carole King were the lead singers for the popular children's cover band Sugar Beats. The Sugar Beats featured The Broadway Kids members and Les Miserables (musical) stars Crysta Macalush Winton and Erin Rakow. Former Dream Street member and Summerland (TV series) star Jesse McCartney was a member of the Sugar Beats. After releasing "80s Greaties" the Sugar Beats broke up in 2009.

== Death ==
Kemp was found dead on April 16, 2015, off the coast of Montego Bay, according to Jamaican reports. He was 55 years old. Kemp had been a passenger on a cruise ship that had docked in Montego Bay. Other cruise ship passengers had seen him earlier that day in the area. Based on an investigation, the St James Police believed he was walking on some rocks, lost his balance, fell, hit his head, and then drowned. He was scheduled to be on the Tom Joyner Foundation-hosted annual Fantastic Voyage cruise as a performer when his body was found; reports state he did not board the ship.

He left behind a wife, Deirdre Fisher-Kemp, and their two sons, one of whom, Jared Kemp, is an actor.

== Discography ==
=== Studio albums ===
| Year | Album | Peak chart positions | |
| Year | Album | US | US R&B |
|---|---|---|---|
| 1986 | Johnny Kemp | — | 36 |
| 1988 | Secrets of Flying | 68 | 4 |
"—" denotes the release did not chart.

=== Compilation albums ===
- Just Got Paid (2004)

=== Singles ===
| Year | Single | Peak chart positions | | | |
| Year | Single | US Dance | US R&B | US Pop | UK |
|---|---|---|---|---|---|
| 1986 | "Just Another Lover" | 26 | 14 | ― | ― |
| 1986 | "Cover Girl" | — | 39 | — | ― |
| 1986 | "Anything Worth Having (Is Worth Waiting For)" | — | ― | — | ― |
| 1988 | "Just Got Paid" | 1 | 1 | 10 | 68 |
| 1988 | "One Thing Led to Another" | — | 40 | — | ― |
| 1988 | "Dancin' With Myself" | 12 | 5 | — | ― |
| 1989 | "Birthday Suit" | 25 | 21 | 36 | ― |
| 1990 | "Cover Girl" | — | — | — | ― |
"—" denotes releases that did not chart or were not released in that territory.

== See also ==
- List of artists who reached number one on the U.S. dance chart
- List of Billboard number-one dance hits
