= Necrotizing meningoencephalitis =

Dog disease

Necrotizing meningoencephalitis (NME) is a fatal inflammatory central nervous system (CNS) disorder in dogs, where an extensive cerebral necrosis is associated with a multifocal, non-suppurative meningoencephalitis of the neuro cortex. It was originally identified and recorded in the 1960s in pure breed pugs, with which this disease is nowadays mostly associated with, occurring essentially in small breed dogs ranging from six months to seven years of age. It causes intense necrotizing inflammatory lesions in the brain stem and Cerebellum. The cause is still unclear. The pathogen that triggers the disease and contributes to its development has not yet been identified. It is presumed to have a multifactorial, heritable, autoimmune etiology. The process is rapidly progressive, culminating in status epilepticus and ending fatally for the dog.

Although the pattern of inflammation is similar to other neuropathological conditions, resembling CNS inflammatory diseases which produces lesions alike to those that occur in NME, a definitive diagnosis can be made solely based on by histopathological examination through a necropsy.

== Signs and symptoms ==
First signs of this immune dysregulation can show through lethargy and the reluctance to walk. Behavioral changes and an abnormal mentation might occur. After a short amount of time vestibulo-cerebellar symptoms will rapidly progress, leaving the animal in a state of depressed consciousness having seizures, amaurosis and ataxia.

Despite seizures being a promoting factor of necrosis in primary inflammation diseases, it's not proven that the necrosis is extending to the white matter due to these convulsions.

== Diagnostics ==
An antemortem diagnosis is often intricate considering the similarities of general neuro diagnostic profiles. To achieve a presumptive diagnosis on the live animal a multimodal approach is needed. Including the magnetic resonance imaging (MRI), computer tomography (CT), cerebrospinal fluid (CFS) analysis and immunological test. Since only the CNS is affected by the pathology, there won't be any characteristic changes in organ systems other than the nervous system. Despite clinical examination methods, the specific diagnosis of NME depends on a postmortem, histopathological examination of the brain biopsy tissue or a necropsy.

== Histopathological features ==
When examining the transversal sections, the non-suppurative (lymphoplasmacytic and histiocytic) inflammation of both the meninges and encephalitis have characteristic histopathologic changes of necrotizing nature in the corona radiata (white matter), the thalamus and the cerebrocortical area. The meninges itself is focally thickened by dense aggregations of lymphocytes, plasma cells and macrophages infiltrating due to the reinforced immune answer (perivascular cuffing).

Several multifocal encephalic lesions in corona radiata are erasing the border in the cerebral hemispheres between white and grey matter, exposing an asymmetrical ventricular enlargement. These lesions are selective with a predilection for the cerebral hemisphere.

They can be divided into three phases:

- Acute - mild inflammatory cell infiltration
- Subacute – intense inflammatory reactions
- Chronic – increase of perivascular cuffing, extensive necrosis

Additionally, temporal lobes with dense mononuclear cells can be observed infiltrating the meninges, and cerebellar herniation through the foramen magnum, which leads to neurological symptoms like continuous circling or stroke-like seizures. Attempts at proving a viral etiology have been unsuccessful.

== Treatment ==
In several studies the animals were given immunosuppressive drugs, such as cytarabine, prednisolone and dexamethasone on the behalf that the cause of NME is autoimmune related. Corticosteroids inhibit T-and B-Cells and slow down the production of cytokines, which restrain the immune system from attacking its own cells but also enfeeble its natural protection – the immune answer.

However, since the etiopathogenesis is still not totally understood, the inflammatory reactions are only partly reacting to the corticosteroids, such as the malacic or granulomatous changes.

== Prognosis ==
Even after several years of research, the complete pathogenesis of this disease is still not understood. Immunosuppressive and anticonvulsant drugs have extended the lives of several dogs for up to 7 months after the outbreak of the symptoms, although a complete recovery is not yet possible.

The disease remains fatal, making euthanasia an invariable necessity.
