= New manufacturing economy =

Economic concept

The new manufacturing economy (NME) describes the role of advanced manufacturing in the rise of the New Economy. The term describes manufacturing enabled by digital technologies, advanced systems and processes and a highly trained and knowledgeable workforce. The new manufacturing economy integrates networks, 3D printers and other proficiencies into business strategies to further develop manufacturing practices.

Thomas Friedman references Lawrence F. Katz that hubs of "universities, high-tech manufacturers, software/service providers and highly nimble start-ups" are a needed economic development strategy. This is very similar to NME thoughts even though that exact term is not used.

== The Pillars of the new manufacturing economy ==
=== Technology ===
Focus on geographic expansion, information technology and internet commerce are on the rise for industrial manufacturing companies according to the PricewaterhouseCoopers Q4 2010 Manufacturing Barometer. Such conditions compel companies to incorporate new technologies into business plans and to concentrate on the application of open-source product development in the creation of physical goods as a form of competitive advantage.

New technologies influence various industries to emphasize innovation as a business tool . Advanced manufacturing is feasible due to continuous improvement investments and modernization of the workforce, technologies and supply chains in order to increase global competitiveness, environmental sustainability and product customization to meet consumer expectations.

=== Workforce ===
Incorporating modern CNC equipment in new manufacturing processes requires trained employees with specific skills than were previously required in heavy industry. Past manufacturing job consisted largely of physical labor and worker's need to meet assembly line requirements, but in response to technological evolution they are becoming tech-savvy and information-centric with a focus on creativity and resourcefulness.

=== Strategy ===
The new manufacturing economy is centered around "niche" businesses who satisfy the needs of small consumer markets by offering what customers want, when they want it. The primary foundation of this strategy is selling less of more. Adopting the efficiencies of digital and Web-based technologies into current business strategies is an emerging trend in manufacturing practices.

=== Industries ===
Advanced technology in the manufacturing marketplace has led to growth in areas such as software development and biotechnology and to emphasis on numerous industries such as:

- Liquid and biofuels
- Solar energy
- Renewable resources
- Environmental sustainability
- Pharmaceutical manufacturing
- Logistics

== Related terms ==
- Smart manufacturing
- New Economy
- Manufacturing intelligence
- The Long Tail
