= Psychonaut 4 =

Georgian metal band

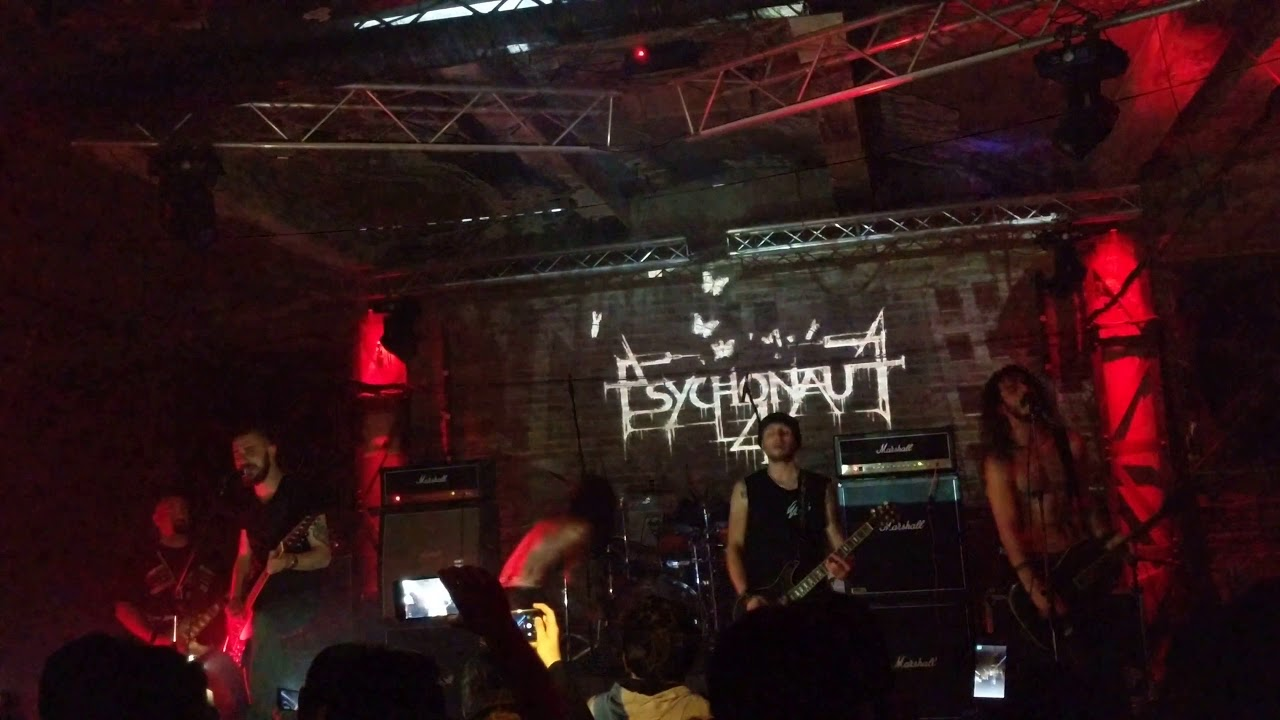

Background information
- Origin: Tbilisi, Georgia
- Genre: Depressive suicidal black metal
- Years active: 2010–present
- Labels: Immortal Frost Productions; Talheim; Depressive Illusions
- Members: Irakli Kirkitadze; Drifter; Alex Menabde; S.D. Ramirez; Giorgi Kordzakhia
- Past members: André; Glixxx; Nepho; Borger; Graf von Baphomet

Psychonaut 4 is a Georgian depressive suicidal black metal band formed in 2010.

They have released five studio albums, most recently ...of Mourning in 2024.

Their name is derived from the term psychonaut, meaning someone who frequently uses psychedelic drugs, and the number four referring to the four plateaus experienced using dextromethorphan. The band's lyrics are typically in Georgian, Russian, and English.

As of 2020, they have performed in 24 countries.

== Members ==
=== Current ===
- Drifter – guitar, backing vocals (2010–present), drums (2024–present)
- Alex Menabde – bass (2015–present)
- S.D. Ramirez (Shota Darakhvelidze) – guitar, backing vocals (2013–2021, 2022–present)
- Giorgi Kordzakhia – guitar, backing vocals (2020–present)
- Irakli Kirkitadze - vocals (2024–present)

=== Past ===
- Glixxx (Temur Lomidze) – guitar (2010–2024)
- Nepho – drums (2011–2024)
- Graf von Baphomet – vocals (2010–2024)
- André (Lasha Adamia) – bass (2010–2012, 2013–2015)
- Borger – drums (2010–2011)

== Discography ==
=== Albums ===
- Have a Nice Trip (2012)
- Dipsomania (2015)
- Neurasthenia (2016)
- Beautyfall (2020)
- Scrapes from the past (2022)
- ...of Mourning (2024)

=== Demos ===
- 40% (2011)
