= Johann Christian August Clarus =

German anatomist and surgeon

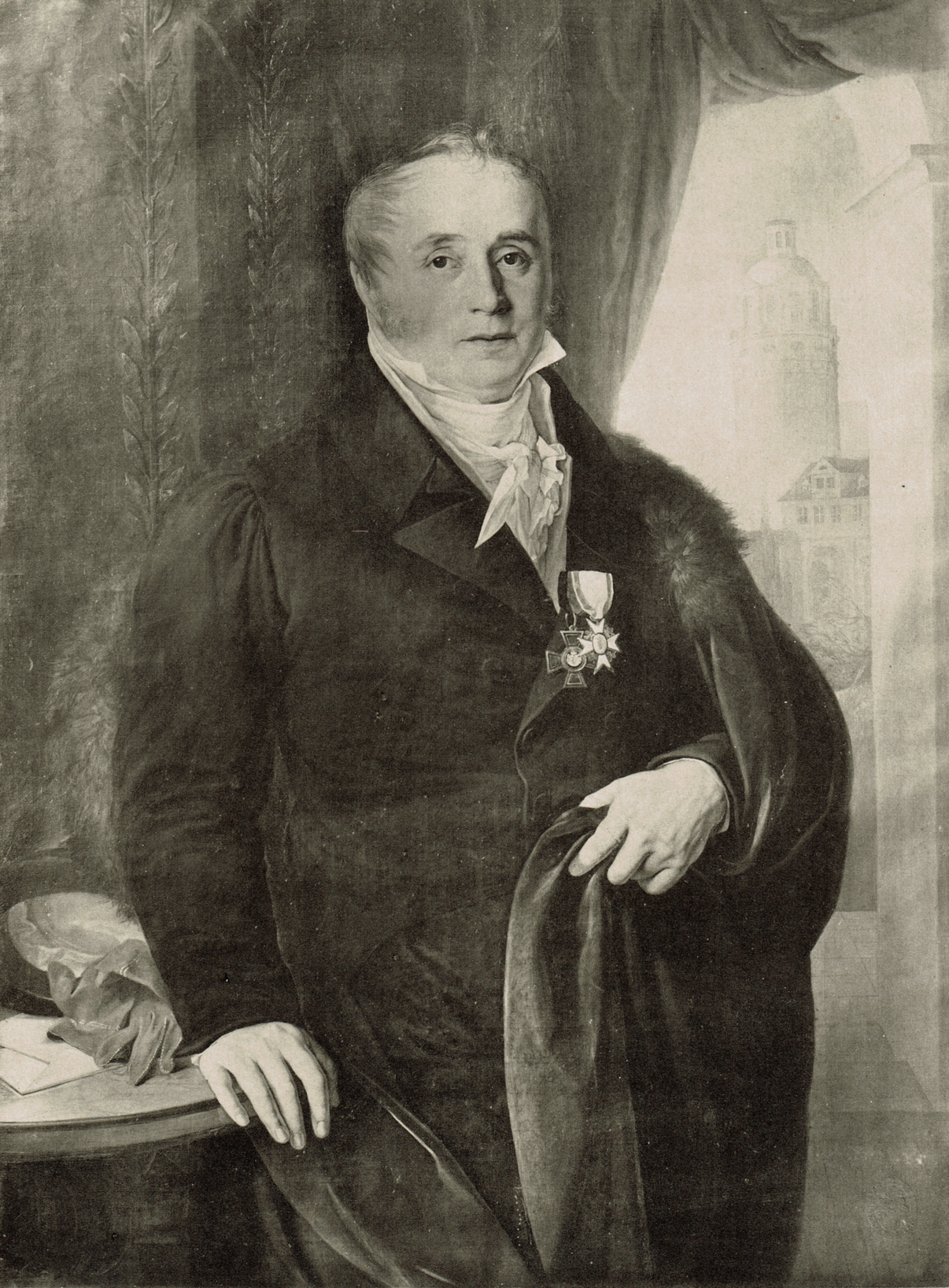
- Johann Christian August Clarus (1774–1854)
- Born: November 5, 1774; Buch am Forst, near Coburg, Germany
- Died: July 13, 1854 (aged 79); Leipzig, Germany
- Education: University of Leipzig (MD, 1798)
- Occupations: Anatomist; Surgeon; Physician
- Employers: University of Leipzig; Jacobshospital, Leipzig
- Known for: Forensic reports on Johann Christian Woyzeck, source for Georg Büchner's Woyzeck

Johann Christian August Clarus (5 November 1774 – 13 July 1854) was a German anatomist and surgeon from Buch am Forst near Coburg.

In 1798 he obtained his medical doctorate from the University of Leipzig, where from 1803 to 1820, he served as an associate professor of anatomy and surgery. He also served as city physician in Leipzig. From 1820 to 1848 he was a professor of clinical medicine at the university as well as senior physician at Jacobshospital in Leipzig. In 1840–1841 he served as university rector. From 1848 onward, he worked in his private medical practice.

On 24 August 1821, he was called upon to write a report on the mental condition of confessed murderer Johann Christian Woyzeck (1780–1824). After meeting with Woyzeck, Clarus maintained that he was accountable for his actions, despite the fact that he suffered from hallucinations. Later on, he was asked to write a second report. He met with Woyzeck several more times, and reached the same conclusion as in his initial report. Clarus' writings on the mental state of Woyzeck were published with the title Die Zurechnungsfähigkeit des Morders Johann Christian Woyzeck and subsequently used as a source by dramatist Georg Büchner for the stage play Woyzeck.

Clarus died in Leipzig in 1854.

== Selected writings ==
- "Topographiae botanicae et entomologicae Lipsiensis", (with Christian Friedrich Schwägrichen), 1799.
- Der Krampf in pathologischer und therapeutischer Hinsicht, 1822 - Spasms from a pathological and therapeutic perspective.
- Die Zurechnungsfähigkeit des Morders Johann Christian Woyzeck, 1824 - On the sanity of murderer Johann Christian Woyzeck.
- Beiträge zur Erkenntniss und Beurtheilung zweifelhafter Seelenzustände, 1828 - Contributions to the knowledge and judgment of dubious psychological states.
- "Adversaria clinica", 1846.
