= Kociniak =

Kociniak is a surname. Notable people with the surname include:

- Jan Kociniak (1937–2007), Polish actor
- Marian Kociniak (1936–2016), Polish actor
