= Różewicz =

Różewicz is a Polish surname. Notable people with the surname include:

- Stanisław Różewicz (1924–2008), Polish film director and screenwriter
- Tadeusz Różewicz (1921–2014), Polish poet and writer
