= Oliver Herbrich =

German director

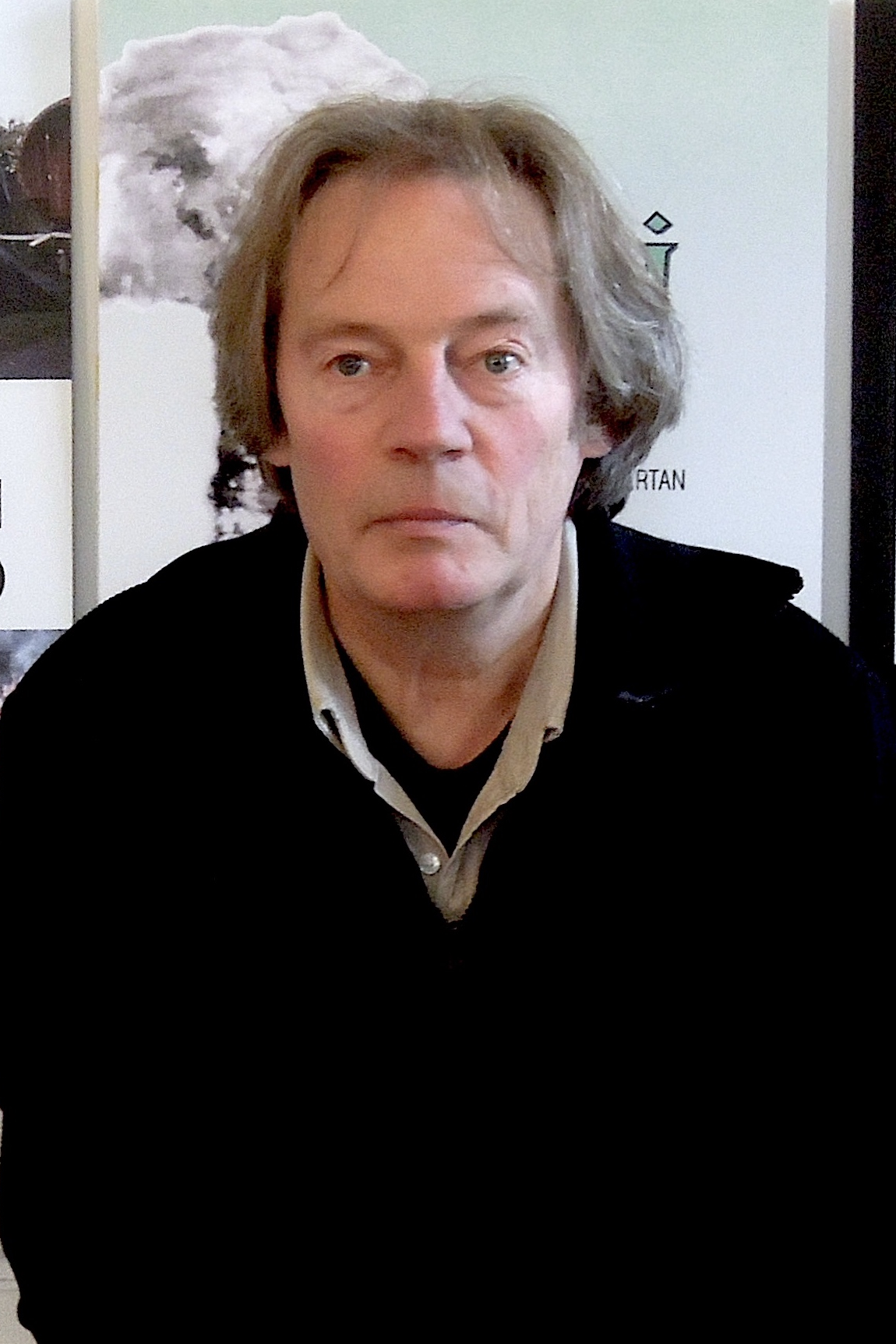
Oliver Herbrich presenting the film retrospective at Cinema Breitwand, 2018/19

Oliver Herbrich (born 1961 in Munich) is a German filmmaker working as an author, film director and producer. He is associated with the very end of the New German Cinema movement. From 2016 to 2018, his films were digitally remastered and re-released in the Fiction – Non-Fiction Film Edition. In 2018, the Film Museum Düsseldorf added all archival documents to its collection.

== Work ==
In 1979, before his Abitur, Herbrich made his cinema debut with The Proud and Sad Life of Mathias Kneissl with the support of the “Kuratorium Junger Deutscher Film” (Young German Film Committee). Although Herbrich was enrolled in the feature film department of the University of Television and Film Munich starting in 1980, it was here that he made his first two documentaries, which were shot under adverse conditions in the Australian desert and the Amazon jungle. Since then he has worked on both narrative and documentary films.

After completing his studies, Herbrich turned back to feature filmmaking in 1984. Wodzeck, an adaptation of Georg Büchner's Woyzeck, was a German entry in the competition at the 14th Moscow International Film Festival and won the award for "Best Male Leading Role". The film was also presented at 20 other festivals. As an auteur filmmaker (Herbrich is involved in all films as director, screenwriter and producer) he is a representative of the New German Cinema of the 1980s and 90s. In order to have his own production equipment such as film cameras and editing tables, Herbrich founded the technology service provider LICHT & TON Ltd, which existed until 2010.

The success of Wodzeck was followed by further documentaries: Bikini - mon amour dealt with the recent consequences of above-ground atomic bomb tests. Like Searching for El Dorado, Bikini - mon amour reached an audience of millions when it was shown in prime time on German TV Channel 1 (ARD). In 1985/86 Herbrich made a documentary biopic with Bavarian jailbreak king Theo Berger. Titled The Bavarian Al Capone, it also caused a sensation and was not allowed to be broadcast on Bavarian television (BR). After being released in cinemas, the film was broadcast on West German television (WDR). For this broadcast, the film needed to be subtitled in Standard German.

In 1988, the “Filmmakers' Distribution Association” re-released Herbrich's films in the edition "Fiction - Non-Fiction". In the same year, he shot his third feature film Earthbound. The film is a fictional adaptation inspired by the life story of Gustav Mesmer. Earthbound received international awards and stars Hannes Thanheiser, Rüdiger Vogler and Vera Tschechowa.

Oliver Herbrich ended his career as a filmmaker with two cinema documentaries shot in Nepal and Ireland. For his complete works, he was awarded the "Film Prize of the City of Munich" in 1994.

In 2016-18 the reels of negative films archived in the Federal Film Archive Berlin were digitally remastered and reissued in the "Fiction - Non-Fiction Film Edition". A collection of analogue (16 and 35 mm) film copies is owned by the Film Museum Munich and the Film Museum Düsseldorf. In 2018, Film Museum Düsseldorf catalogued all written documents from the films.

== Cinematic approach ==
Dieter Kosslick, former director of Berlin International Film Festival outlined Herbrich's working style as follows:

"Fortunately Oliver Herbrich doesn't create an ideology when walking the line between fictional movie and documentary film. Herbrich’s approach is solely based on the storytelling needs of the subjects. Remarkably, this technique results in a combination of documentary and fictional elements. There's one sequence in the film Mathias Kneissl where a brigade of gendarmes is closing in on the folk hero. The resulting police violence is reminiscent of documentary reports. Vice versa, his documentary films include elements of fiction. The scenes of gold diggers carrying sacks of mud uphill from their claims in the documentary Searching for El Dorado reminds the viewer of monumental feature movies. This evokes a mythologization of real life, revealing the general in the particular. One can describe Herbrich’s films as stories about human behavior, depicting the mechanisms of reality. Reaching limits and crossing borders is something to be taken in the literal sense in Herbrich’s oeuvre.“ (Dieter Kosslick, 1994).

== Filmography ==
- 1979/80 The Proud and Sad Life of Mathias Kneissl (Das stolze und traurige Leben des Mathias Kneißl)
- 1982 Dead Heart (Totes Herz)
- 1983/84 Searching for El Dorado (Auf der Suche nach El Dorado)
- 1983/84 Wodzeck
- 1985/86 The Bavarian Al Capone (Der Al Capone vom Donaumoos)
- 1986/87 The World beyond the World (Die Welt jenseits der Welt)
- 1987 Bikini – mon amour
- 1988/89 Earthbound (Erdenschwer)
- 1991 Priests of the Condemned (Priester der Verdammten)
- 1992/93 Rules of the Road (Gesetz der Straße)

== Awards ==
- 1980 and 1984 rating “Highly Recommended” for Mathias Kneissl and Searching for El Dorado
- 1985 Prix d'Antenne II, Paris (Festival Cinéma du Réel) for Searching for El Dorado; 2nd Prize Cine-stud Film Fest, Amsterdam for Searching for El Dorado; Best Male Actor (International Film Festival Moscow) for Detlef Kügow in Wodzeck
- 1989 Honorary Mention at 4th Medikinale International Parma, Italy for Bikini – mon amour; Honorary Mention at Red Cross and Health Film Fest Varna, Bulgaria for Bikini – mon amour
- 1990 Best Screenplay (Festival Imag Fic, Madrid) for Earthbound; Best Artistic Contribution (Festival Europa Cinema, Viareggio) for Earthbound; Prix de la Fédération international del Cine Club (Festival Figuera da Foz, Portugal) for Earthbound
- 1994 Film Prize of the City of Munich (lifetime achievement)

== Retrospectives ==
- 1987 Low Budget Festival Hamburg, Germany
- 1989 Film Week Onikon Cinema Herdecke, Germany
- 1990 West Virginia Film Festival, Charleston, USA
- 1993 Film Museum Düsseldorf, Germany
- 1994 Film Museum Munich, Germany
- 2018 Breitwand Cinema Gauting, Germany

== Social Engagement ==
- 1990–2000 Sponsor “Award for the Outstanding Documentary“ (International Documentary Film Festival Munich)
- 2010 start of charity NGO “Foundation Oliver Herbrich Children's Fund”
