= Gmina Chybie =

Gmina Chybie Chybie Commune
- Gmina
- Coat of arms

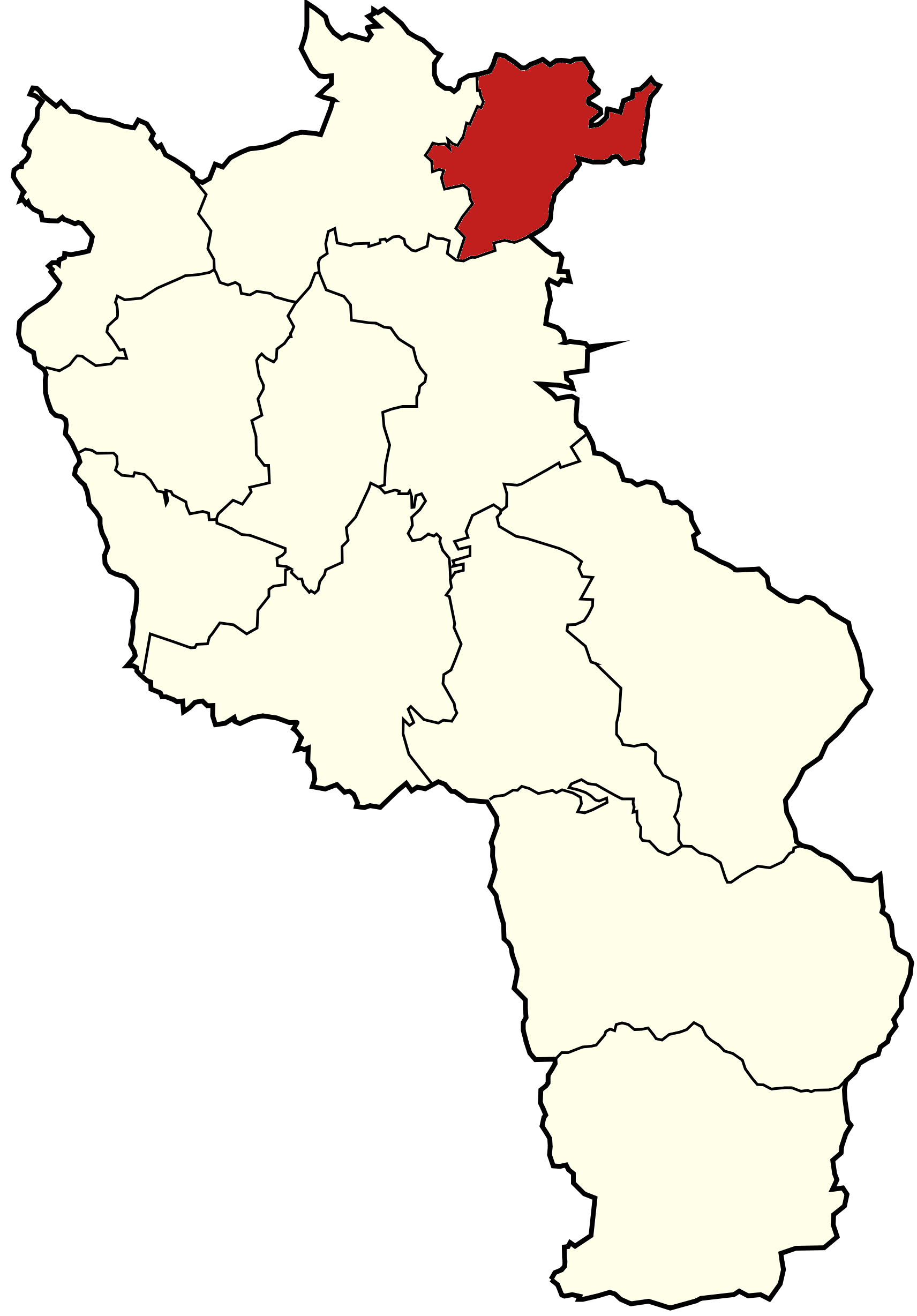
- Gmina Chybie within the Cieszyn County
- Coordinates (Chybie): 49°53′42″N 18°48′48″E
- Country: Poland
- Voivodeship: Silesian
- County: Cieszyn
- Seat: Chybie

Government
  - Mayor: Janusz Żydek

Area
  - Total: 31.8 km^{2} (12.3 sq mi)

Population (2019-06-30)
  - Total: 9,803
  - Density: 308/km^{2} (798/sq mi)
- ZIP code: 43-520
- Website: http://www.chybie.pl/

Gmina Chybie is a rural gmina (administrative district) in Cieszyn County, Silesian Voivodeship, in southern Poland, in the historical region of Cieszyn Silesia. Its seat is the village of Chybie.

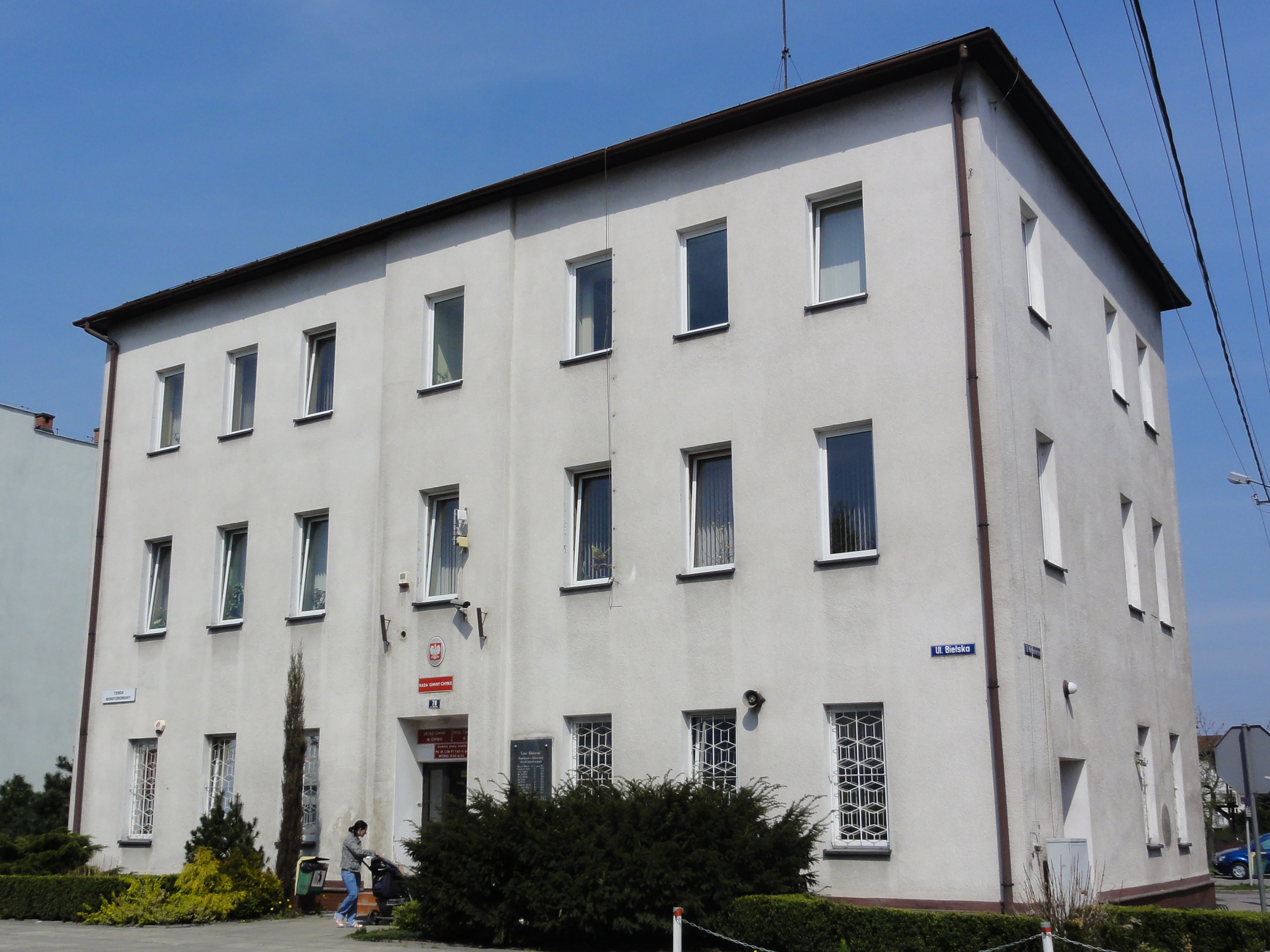
Gmina administration building in Chybie

The gmina covers an area of 31.8 square kilometres (12.3 sq mi), and as of 2019 its total population is 9,803.

== Villages ==
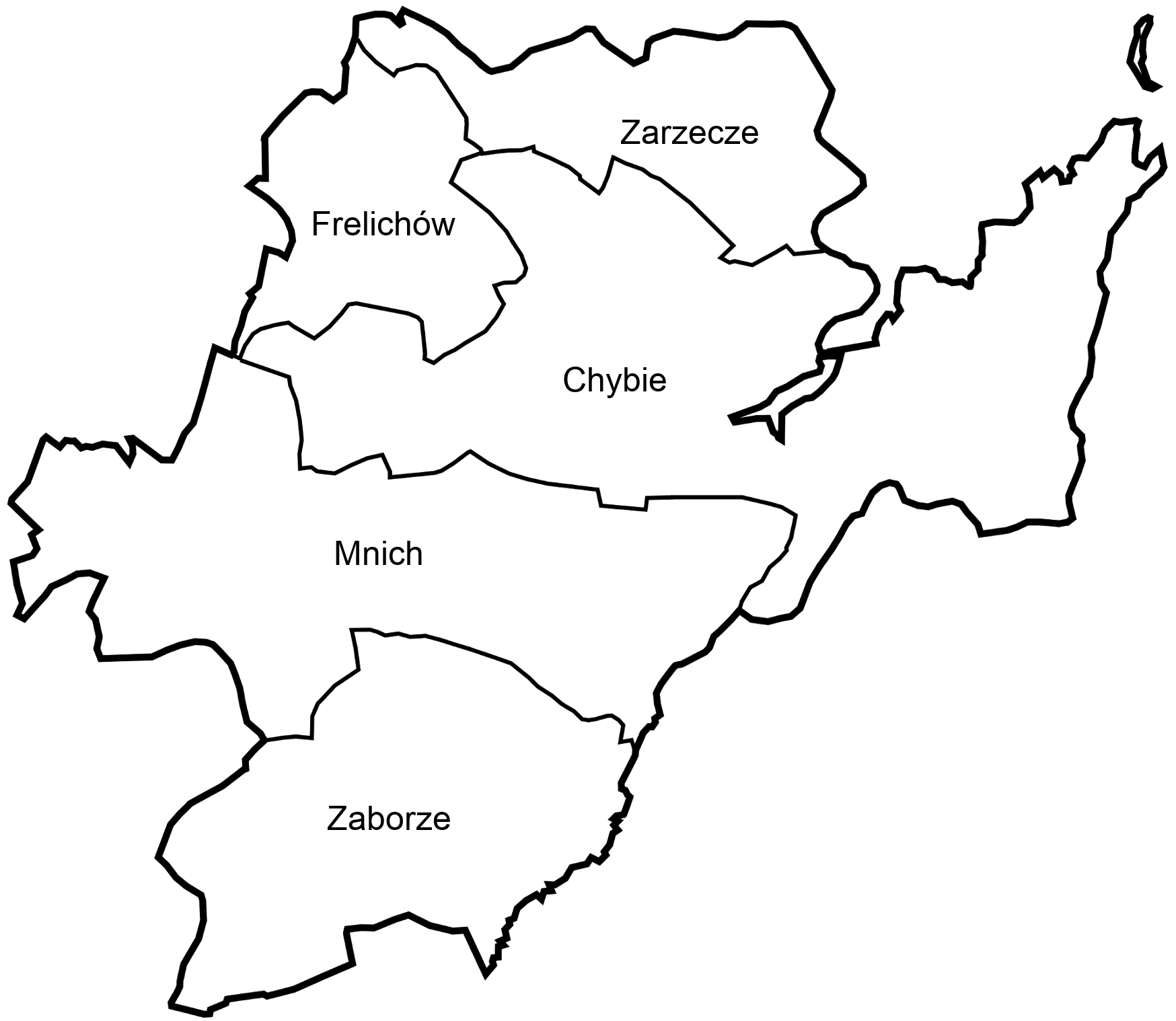
Division of the gmina

Gmina Chybie contains the villages and settlements of Chybie, Frelichów, Mnich, Zaborze and Zarzecze.

== Neighbouring gminas ==
Gmina Chybie is bordered by the gminas of Czechowice-Dziedzice, Goczałkowice-Zdrój, Jasienica, Skoczów and Strumień.

== Notable people ==
- Henryk Machalica (1930–2003), actor
- Bogumił Kobiela (1931–1969), theatre actor
- Ryszard Staniek (born 1971), footballer

== Twin towns – sister cities ==
Gmina Chybie is twinned with:

- Těrlicko, Czech Republic
