= The Descent of the Nine =

1984 film

- Directed by: Christos Siopahas
- Written by: Thanassis Valtinos
- Starring: Christos Kalavrouzos
- Cinematography: Nikos Kavoukidis
- Release date: 2 October 1984
- Running time: 122 minutes
- Country: Greece
- Language: Greek

The Descent of the Nine (Greek: Η κάθοδος των εννιά, romanized: I káthodos ton eniá) is a 1984 Greek adventure film directed by Christos Siopahas. It won one of the three golden prizes of the 14th Moscow International Film Festival.

== Cast ==
- Christos Kalavrouzos as Nikitas
- Antonis Antoniou as Kostis
- Vasilis Tsaglos as Sarantos
- Elias Yannitsos as Nasios
- Kostas Haralabidis
- Kostas Vihas
- Hrysanthos Hrysanthou
- Kostas Tzouvaras
- Stratos Pahis
- Dimitris Yiannakopoulos
- Christos Zorbas as Giannis
