= Cláudio Marzo =

Brazilian actor (1940–2015)

- Born: Cláudio da Silva Marzo; September 26, 1940; São Paulo, Brazil
- Died: March 22, 2015 (aged 74); Rio de Janeiro, Brazil
- Occupation: Actor
- Years active: 1960–2015
- Children: 3

Cláudio da Silva Marzo (26 September 1940 – 22 March 2015) was a Brazilian film and television actor. With a career spanning more than five decades, he became known for his work in telenovelas, miniseries and feature films, and was regarded as one of the most versatile performers of his generation.

== Early life ==
Marzo was born in São Paulo and worked in several trades before entering the entertainment industry. His acting career began in the early 1960s at TV Excelsior, where he appeared in live television dramas.

== Awards ==
His performance in O Homem Nu (1997) earned him the Best Actor award at the Festival de Gramado.

== Personal life ==
Marzo had three children from different relationships and was known for maintaining a relatively private personal life.

== Death ==
Marzo died on 22 March 2015 in Rio de Janeiro from complications related to pneumonia. His death received wide coverage in Brazilian media, and colleagues praised his contribution to national television and cinema.

== Selected filmography ==
=== Film ===
- Lady on the Bus (1978)
- Pra Frente, Brasil (1982)
- Memoirs of Prison (1984)
- Avaete, Seed of Revenge (1985)
- O País dos Tenentes (1987)
- Perfume de Gardênia (1992)
- The Jew (1995)
- O Homem Nu (1997)
- A Samba for Sherlock (2001)

=== Television ===
- Irmãos Coragem (1970)
- Fera Ferida (1993)
- A Indomada (1997)
- Mulheres Apaixonadas (2003)
