= Wodzeck =

1985 film

- Directed by: Oliver Herbrich
- Written by: Oliver Herbrich
- Based on: Woyzeck by Georg Büchner
- Produced by: Oliver Herbrich Filmproduction
- Starring: Detlef Kügow; Ariane Erdelt; Johannes Habla; Charles Brauer; Hans Beerhenke; Leo Bardischewski; Franz A. Huber; Georg Griewe; Mike Fluhme; Christian Meinke; Regula Siegfried; Georg Wiedemeyer; Uwe Franke; Peter Just; Geiorg Baumberger
- Cinematography: Ludolph Weyer
- Edited by: Romy Schumann
- Music by: Andreas Hofner
- Distributed by: endfilm
- Release date: 8 February 1985
- Running time: 82 minutes
- Country: West Germany
- Language: German

Wodzeck is a 1984 West German drama film directed by Oliver Herbrich based on the 1837 play Woyzeck by Georg Büchner. It was entered into the 14th Moscow International Film Festival where Detlef Kügow received the "Award for best male actor" for his leading role in the film.

== Plot ==
Franz Wodzeck works on a factory production line in the German rust belt region. He lives in a workmen's dwelling on the factory area. To Andres, his roommate, he reports about his fixed ideas, but even Andres cannot help him. His only relief comes from strolling through one of these decayed areas between civilization and nature. This seems to calm him down a little.

There is very little emotion in his life until he meets Maleen, a cashier in a department store. One evening when she has no time for him he tries to participate in the pleasure seeking of the people. The hard work and the despair make Wodzeck suffer. He consults the staff doctor but he just wants to ensure Wodzeck's fitness for work. During a porno film show, some of his fellowworkmen call Wodzeck's attention to Maleen's new relationship with the boss who had asked her for a dance at the workshop Christmas party. Wodzeck can't believe that. When he meet her, Maleen tells him she wants to enjoy her life.

Suddenly Wodzeck feels lonely and forsaken. In a taxi he rides the streets in the city, aimless and desperate. At night, he feels tormented by horrible dreams recalling his time in the mortuary. In great haste he puts on his clothes and runs out of the door. Without success he tries again to meet Maleen. Anxious, he is listening to imaginary voices. “What? Even the wind is whispering that?” Wodzeck is horrified. In the evening he watches again Maleen dancing with her new friend. In the discotheque the stroboscope flashes seem to shatter all their motions. He feels every picture burned again in his brain.

The next morning he is hopeless. He bequeathes all his effects to Andres who cannot help him. Eventually he buys a knife and stabs Maleen to death. After that, he seems to recover his senses. When he realizes that he has killed what has been the most beloved being in his life, madness overwhelms him.

He is apprehended wandering the streets. Several psychological experts declare him unfit to stand trial. Committed to a psychiatric asylum, he feels neither anxiety nor desire. He simply exists.

== Reception ==
Herbrich commissioned film composer Andreas Hofner to create some pop songs with German lyrics for the film – a task he only reluctantly accepted. The film was premiered at the 18th Hof International Film Festival in 1984.

Wodzeck was presented at 20 international film festivals. In Germany it was released by enfilm, Christian Meinke, who also appeared as the taxi driver in the film. In 2017, the 35mm film was digitally remastered and re-released in the Fiction – Non-Fiction Film Edition.

== Literature ==
- Barbara Braam "Literarische Vorlage und filmische Aktualisierung. Zu O. Herbrichs Wodzeck", Aachen 1989 (Rheinisch Westfälische Technische Hochschule Aachen)
- Oliver Herbrich "Wodzeck - Drehbuch", 2018 (Fiction – Non-Fiction Film Edition) ISBN 978-3-00-058911-9
