= Woman in a Hat =

1985 film

- Directed by: Stanisław Różewicz
- Written by: Stanisław Różewicz
- Starring: Hanna Mikuć
- Cinematography: Jerzy Wójcik
- Release dates: July 1985 (Moscow); 2 September 1985 (Poland)
- Running time: 105 minutes
- Country: Poland
- Language: Polish

Woman in a Hat (Polish: Kobieta w kapeluszu) is a 1985 Polish drama film directed by Stanisław Różewicz. It was entered into the 14th Moscow International Film Festival where it won the Silver Prize.

== Cast ==
- Hanna Mikuć as Ewa
- Maria Czubasiewicz as Grabowska
- Barbara Dziekan as Jadwiga
- Krzysztof Gosztyła as N.
- Mieczysław Grąbka as Rysio
- Marek Kondrat as Lewicki
- Wiesława Mazurkiewicz as Ewa's Mother
- Henryk Machalica as Jan Ziembiński
- Magdalena Wołłejko as Magda
- Jan Kociniak as Janitor
- Tomasz Lengren as Film Director
- Wanda Stanisławska-Lothe as Zielińska
