= Chybie =

- Village
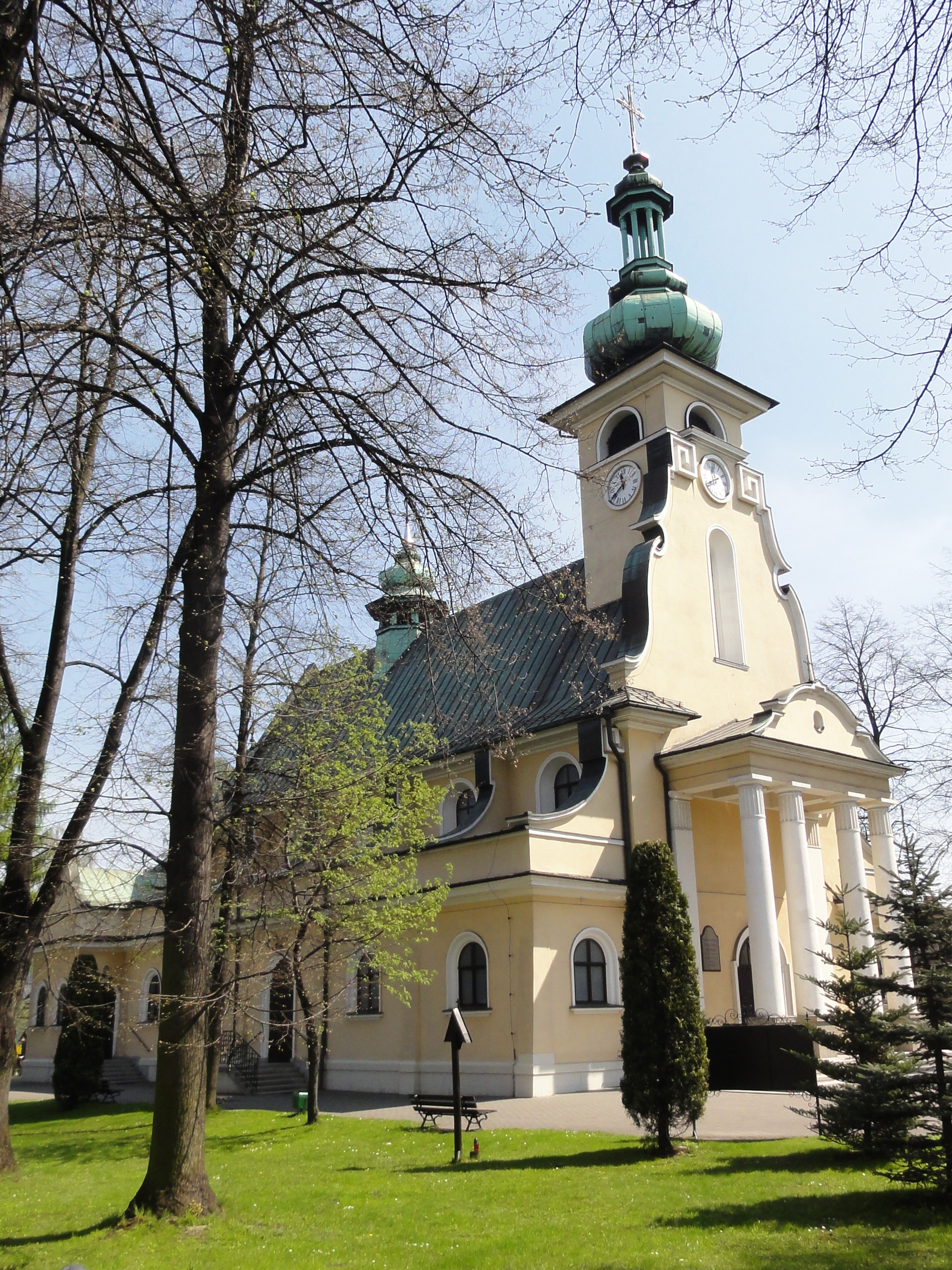
- Church of Christ the King

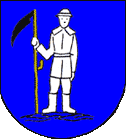
- Coat of arms

- Location within Poland
- Coordinates: 49°53′41.8″N 18°48′47.88″E
- Country: Poland
- Voivodeship: Silesian
- County: Cieszyn
- Gmina: Chybie

Government
  - Mayor: Bożena Kunc

Area
  - Total: 11.22 km^{2} (4.33 sq mi)
  - Land: 11.22 km^{2} (4.33 sq mi)
  - Water: 0 km^{2} (0 sq mi)
- Elevation: 254 m (833 ft)

Population (2012)
  - Total: 3,900
  - Estimate (2012): 3,903
  - Rank: 9th in Cieszyn
  - Density: 347.9/km^{2} (901/sq mi)
- Time zone: UTC+1 (CET)
  - Summer (DST): UTC+2 (CEST)
- ZIP code: 43-520
- Area code: 33
- Car plates: SCI
- SIMC feature ID: 0050765
- Website: www.chybie.pl

Chybie is a village and the seat of Gmina Chybie in Cieszyn County, Silesian Voivodeship, southern Poland. It lies in the Upper Vistula Valley within Oświęcim Basin and in the historical region of Cieszyn Silesia. There is a nature reserve called Rotuz in the eastern part of the village.

== History ==
It was first mentioned in a written document in 1568 as Zeleny Chyb. Politically it belonged then to the Duchy of Teschen, a fee of the Kingdom of Bohemia, which after 1526 became part of the Habsburg monarchy.

After Revolutions of 1848 in the Austrian Empire a modern municipal division was introduced in the re-established Austrian Silesia. The village as a municipality was subscribed to the political district of Bielsko and the legal district of Strumień. A sugar mill was established by Teschener Kammer in the village in 1884 (defunct since 2009).

According to the censuses conducted in 1880, 1890, 1900 and 1910 the population of the municipality grew from 676 in 1880 to 1231 in 1910 with a dwindling majority being native Polish-speakers (from 93.4% in 1880 to 80.9% in 1910) and a growing German-speaking minority (from 36 or 5.4% in 1880 to 164 or 13.5% in 1910) and Czech-speaking (from 8 or 1.2% in 1880 to 67 or 5.5% in 1910), in terms of religion majority were Roman Catholics (92.5% in 1910), followed by Protestants (52 or 4.2% in 1910), Jews (35 or 2.8%) and 6 persons adhering to yet another faith. The village was also traditionally inhabited by Cieszyn Vlachs, speaking Cieszyn Silesian dialect.

After World War I, fall of Austria-Hungary, Polish–Czechoslovak War and the division of Cieszyn Silesia in 1920, it became a part of Poland. In 1927-1930 a church was built in the village as a filial church of Strumień (in 1957 it became an independent parish). It was then annexed by Nazi Germany at the beginning of World War II. After the war it was restored to Poland.

== People ==
Polish actor Henryk Machalica was born in the village.

== Demographics ==
Historical population
Year	Pop.	±%
1880	676	—
1890	1,156	+71.0%
1900	1,231	+6.5%
1910	1,241	+0.8%
2003	3,627	+192.3%
2004	3,636	+0.2%
2005	3,648	+0.3%
2006	3,675	+0.7%
2007	3,706	+0.8%
2008	3,744	+1.0%
2009	3,809	+1.7%
2010	3,850	+1.1%
2011	3,870	+0.5%
2012	3,903	+0.9%

== Culture ==
=== Festivals and events ===
Annual cultural festival is Żabionalia.

== Sport ==
=== Football ===
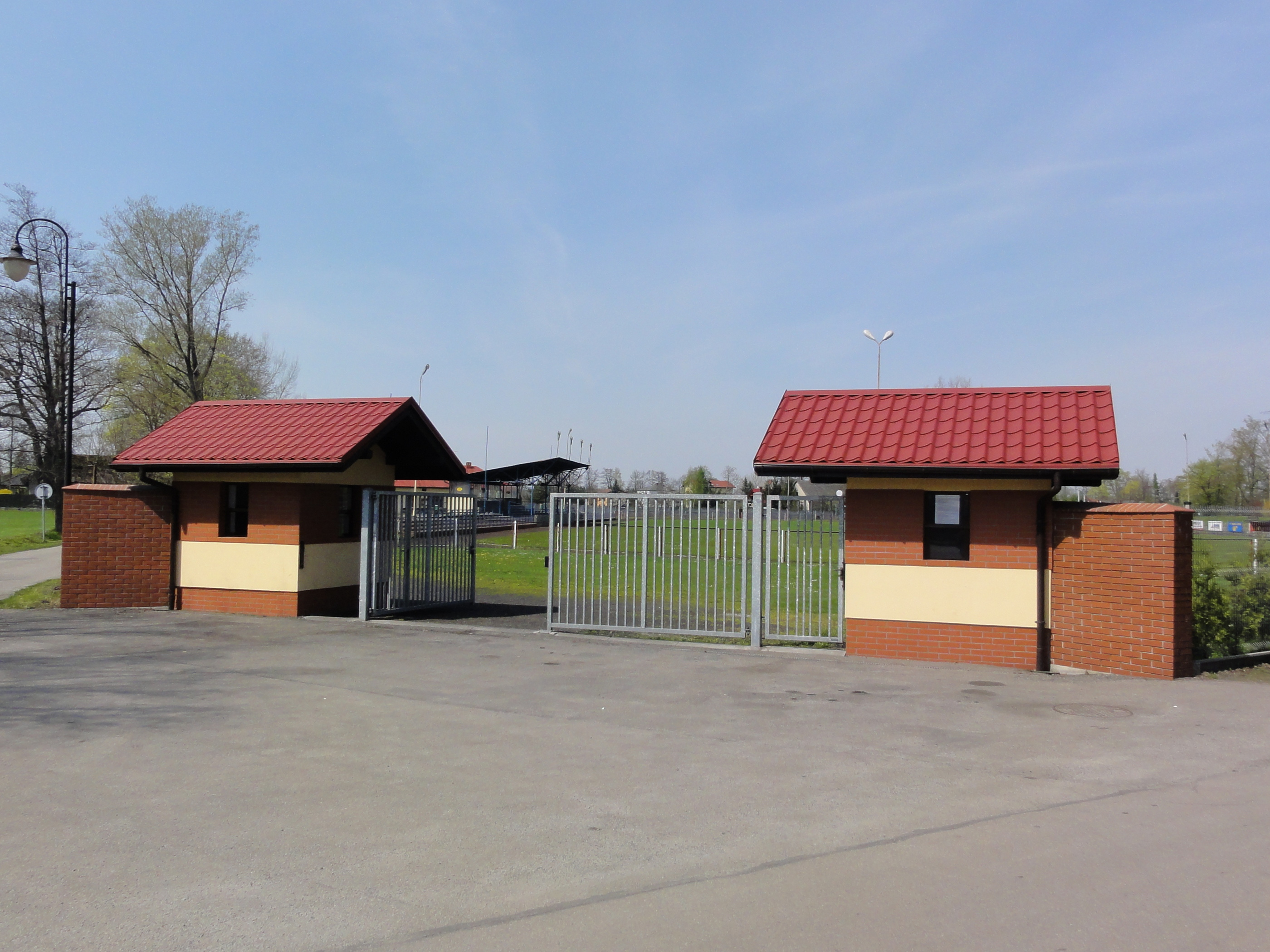
Entrance to Cukrownik Stadium

The RKS Cukrownik Chybie soccer team was founded in 1937, currently plays in regional league of Silesian Voivodeship.

=== Table tennis ===
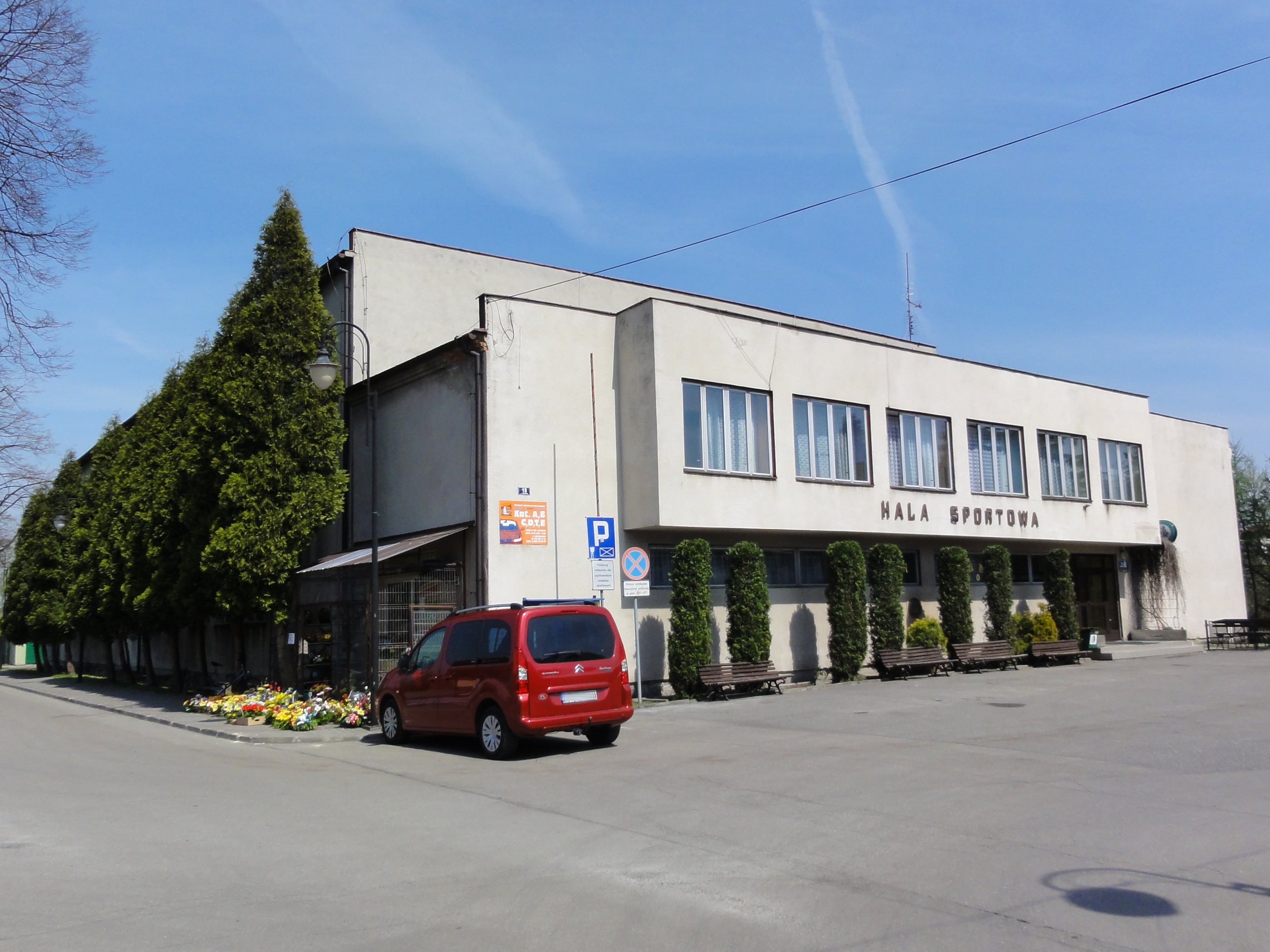
Sport hall in Chybie

The RKS Cukrownik Chybie woman team of table tennis was founded in 1979, currently plays in second division of national league, where it advanced in 2002.

== Parks and recreation ==
Chybie has one park in the centre of village.

== Sister municipalities ==
Chybie has only two sister cities:

- Ustka, Poland
- Těrlicko (Cierlicko), Czech Republic
