= Frelichów =

- Village
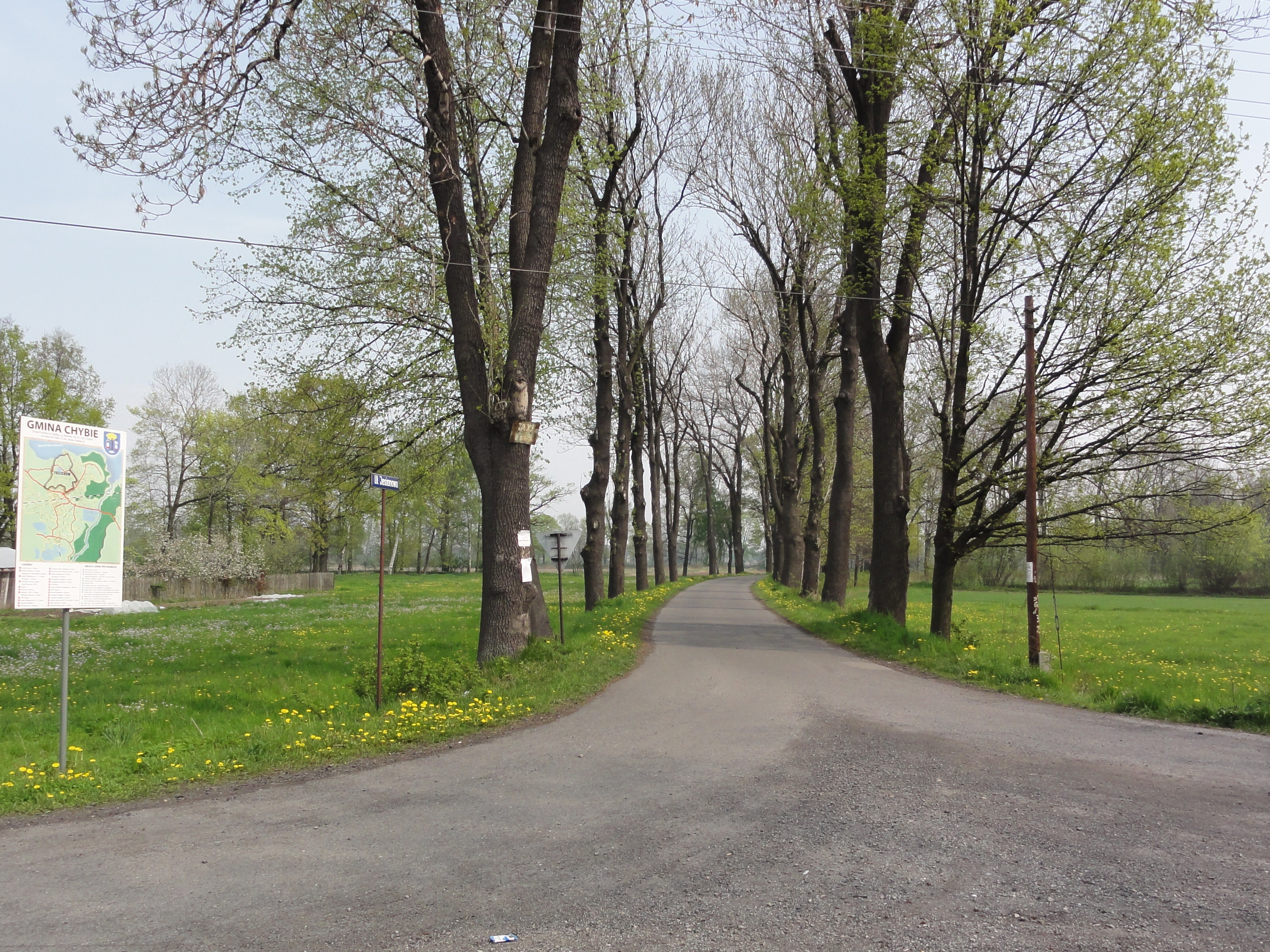
- Fraxinus Avenue

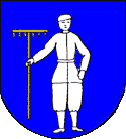
- Coat of arms

- Location within Poland
- Coordinates: 49°54′3.18″N 18°49′33.43″E
- Country: Poland
- Voivodeship: Silesian
- County: Cieszyn
- Gmina: Chybie
- Established: 1698

Government
  - Mayor: Wioleta Waleczek

Area
  - Total: 2.94 km^{2} (1.14 sq mi)

Population (2009)
  - Total: 592
  - Density: 201/km^{2} (522/sq mi)
- Time zone: UTC+1 (CET)
  - Summer (DST): UTC+2 (CEST)
- Postal code: 43-520
- Car plates: SCI

Frelichów [frɛˈlixuf] is a village in Gmina Chybie, Cieszyn County, Silesian Voivodeship, southern Poland. It lies in the historical region of Cieszyn Silesia.

== History ==
The beginnings of the village are connected with a folwark Fröhlichhof founded here by Teschener Kammer around 1698. The settlement that emerged to accommodate its workers grew to become a small but separate village. Politically it belonged to the Duchy of Teschen, a fee of the Kingdom of Bohemia and also a part of the Habsburg monarchy.

After Revolutions of 1848 in the Austrian Empire a modern municipal division was introduced in the re-established Austrian Silesia. The village as a municipality was subscribed to the political district of Bielsko and the legal district of Strumień. According to the censuses conducted in 1880, 1890, 1900 and 1910 the population of the municipality grew from 258 in 1880 to 294 in 1910 with a majority being native Polish-speakers (least 89.1 in 1900, most 96.5 in 1880) followed by a small German-speaking minority (at most 31 or 10.6% in 1900), in terms of religion in 1910 majority were Roman Catholics (267 or 90.8%), followed by Protestants (18 or 6.1%) and Jews (9 or 3.1%). The village was also traditionally inhabited by Cieszyn Vlachs, speaking Cieszyn Silesian dialect.

After World War I, fall of Austria-Hungary, Polish–Czechoslovak War and the division of Cieszyn Silesia in 1920, it became a part of Poland. It was then annexed by Nazi Germany at the beginning of World War II. After the war it was restored to Poland.
