= Hell Train (film) =

1985 film

- Film poster
- Directed by: Roger Hanin
- Written by: Jean Curtelin; Roger Hanin
- Produced by: Christine Gouze-Rénal
- Starring: Roger Hanin
- Cinematography: Jean Penzer
- Edited by: Youcef Tobni
- Music by: Michel Legrand
- Release date: 9 January 1985
- Running time: 90 minutes
- Country: France
- Language: French
- Box office: $7.7 million

Hell Train (French: Train d'enfer) is a 1985 French crime film directed by Roger Hanin. It was entered into the 14th Moscow International Film Festival where it won a Special Prize. inspired by a real story. Habib Grimzi case is a criminal case in which, on November 14, 1983, Habib Grimzi was murdered by being thrown out of the window of the Bordeaux-Vintimille train by three candidates for enlistment in the Foreign Legion, for racist motives.

== Plot ==
Three men are arrested at a local dance for disorderly conduct. After being released the men locate a young Arab and throw him from the window of a moving train. Isabelle witnesses their crime and informs the police. The crime and following police investigation causes racial tension throughout the town and soon a race riot threatens to erupt.

== Cast ==
- Roger Hanin as Commissaire Couturier
- Gérard Klein as Salviat
- Christine Pascal as Isabelle
- Robin Renucci as Muller
- Fabrice Eberhard as Lacombe
- Xavier Maly as Legoff
- Benoît Régent as Jouffroy
- Didier Sandre as Dalbret
- Henri Tisot as Guilabert
- Béatrice Camurat as Mme Salviat
- Karim Allaoui as Karim
- Sam Karmann as Duval
- Pascale Pellegrin as Madeleine
- Nathalie Guérin as Mme Guilabert
- Alain Lahaye as Poli
- Vincent Solignac as Letellier
- Jacques Nolot as Lancry
- Anne Sinclair as herself
- Jacques Gamblin
- Alex Descas
