= Mnich, Silesian Voivodeship =

Mnich
- Village
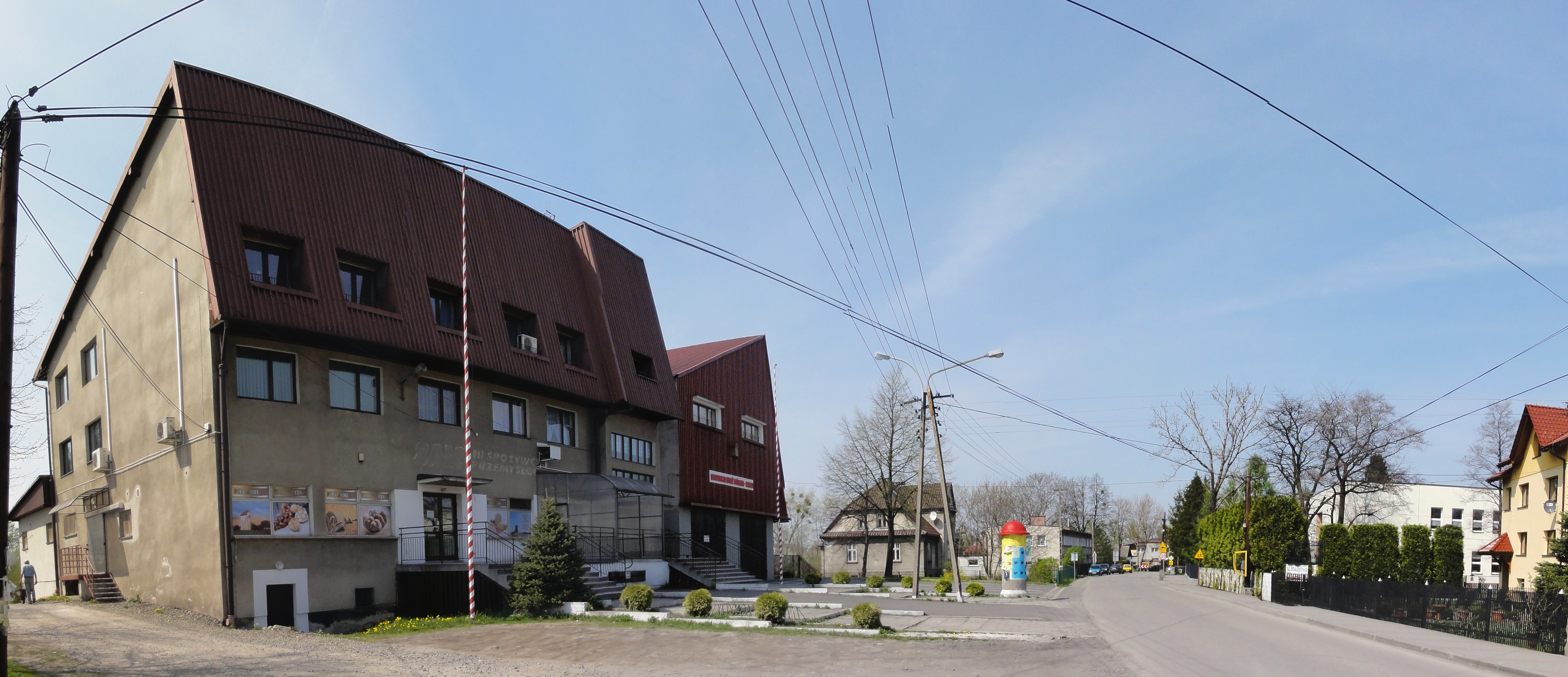
- Village centre

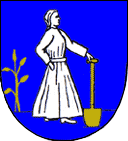
- Coat of arms

- Location within Poland
- Coordinates: 49°53′2.07″N 18°48′24.35″E
- Country: Poland
- Voivodeship: Silesian
- County: Cieszyn
- Gmina: Chybie
- Established: late 16th century

Government
  - Mayor: Grzegorz Ochodek

Area
  - Total: 8.35 km^{2} (3.22 sq mi)

Population (2008)
  - Total: 3,569
  - Density: 427/km^{2} (1,110/sq mi)
- Time zone: UTC+1 (CET)
  - Summer (DST): UTC+2 (CEST)
- Postal code: 43–520
- Car plates: SCI

Mnich [mnix] is a village in Gmina Chybie, Cieszyn County, Silesian Voivodeship, southern Poland. It lies in the historical region of Cieszyn Silesia.

== History ==
The village was founded in the late 16th century when the area belonged to Skoczów-Strumień state country that was purchased back into the Duchy of Teschen in 1594. It was first mentioned in 1621 as Mnich. The name most probably was borrowed from the older local fish pond called Mnich Sswczyny or Mnich Sworczyński. Politically the Duchy of Teschen was a fee of the Kingdom of Bohemia, which was also a part of the Habsburg monarchy.

After Revolutions of 1848 in the Austrian Empire a modern municipal division was introduced in the re-established Austrian Silesia. The village as a municipality was subscribed to the political district of Bielsko and the legal district of Strumień. According to the censuses conducted in 1880, 1890, 1900 and 1910 the population of the municipality grew from 821 in 1880 to 1010 in 1910. A majority of the population were native Polish-speakers (98.3%–99%) accompanied by a small German-speaking minority (at most 10 or 1.2% in 1880) and Czech-speaking (at most 40 or 1.1% in 1890). In terms of religion in 1910, majority were Roman Catholics (93.3%), followed by Protestants (6%), Jews (7 people) and 1 person adhering to yet another faith. The village was also traditionally inhabited by Cieszyn Vlachs, speaking Cieszyn Silesian dialect.

After World War I, fall of Austria-Hungary, Polish–Czechoslovak War and the division of Cieszyn Silesia in 1920, it became a part of Poland. It was then annexed by Nazi Germany at the beginning of World War II. After the war it was restored to Poland.
