= 14th Moscow International Film Festival =

Film festival

- Location: Moscow, Soviet Union
- Founded: 1959
- Awards: Grand Prix
- Festival date: 28 June – 12 July 1985
- Website: http://www.moscowfilmfestival.ru

The 14th Moscow International Film Festival was held from 28 June to 12 July 1985. The Golden Prizes were awarded to the Soviet film Come and See directed by Elem Klimov, the American film A Soldier's Story directed by Norman Jewison and the Greek film The Descent of the Nine directed by Christos Siopahas.

== Jury ==
- Sergei Gerasimov (USSR – President of the Jury)
- Shyam Benegal (India)
- Renate Blume (East Germany)
- Paulin Vieyra (Senegal)
- Jerzy Hoffman (Poland)
- Daisy Granados (Cuba)
- Giuseppe De Santis (Italy)
- Nikos Koundouros (Greece)
- István Nemeskürty (Hungary)
- Kōhei Oguri (Japan)
- Badrahin Sumhu (Mongolia)
- Francois Chavan (France)
- Eldar Shengelaia (USSR)
- Rostislav Yurenev (USSR)
- Robert Young (USA)

== Films in competition ==
The following films were selected for the main competition:

English title	Original title	Director(s)	Production country
Hell Train	Train d'enfer	Roger Hanin	France
Anne Devlin	Anne Devlin	Pat Murphy	Ireland
A Soldier's Story	A Soldier's Story	Norman Jewison	United States
Cool Jazz and Coconuts	Kókóstré og Hvítir Mávar	Jakob Frímann Magnússon	Iceland
Buamama	Buamama	Benamar Bahti	Algeria
Twist and Shout	Tro, håb og kærlighed	Bille August	Denmark
Eternal Fire	Fuego eterno	José Ángel Rebolledo	Spain
Wodzeck	Wodzeck	Oliver Herbrich	West Germany
Kingpin	Kingpin	Mike Walker	New Zealand
The Dame in Colour	La Dame en couleurs	Claude Jutra	Canada
Girl from Mt. Huangshan	Huang shan lai de gu niang	Zhang Yuan, Yu Yan Fu	China
Wild Dogs	Jíbaro	Daniel Díaz Torres	Cuba
The Days of Torments	Jours de tourmentes	Paul Zoumbara	Burkina Faso
Woman in a Hat	Kobieta w kapeluszu	Stanisław Różewicz	Poland
The Rigorous Fate	El rigor del destino	Gerardo Vallejo	Argentina
Come and See	Idi i smotri	Elem Klimov	Soviet Union
Private Resistance	De ijssaloon	Dimitri Frenkel Frank	Netherlands
The Clan – Tale of the Frogs	Klaani: Tarina Sammakoitten suvusta	Mika Kaurismäki	Finland
Where Others Keep Silent	Wo andere schweigen	Ralf Kirsten	East Germany
The Descent of the Nine	I kathodos ton 9	Christos Siopahas	Greece
End of an Era	Yuganthaya	Lester James Peries	Sri Lanka
The Red Countess	A vörös grófnö	András Kovács	Hungary
The Lover	Al-ashiq	Muhir Fenery	Iraq
Tora-san's Forbidden Love	Otoko wa tsurai yo: torajiro shinjitsu ichiro	Yoji Yamada	Japan
The Love Doesn't Come Back	Bao gio cho toi thang muoi	Dang Nhat Minh	Vietnam
Mexican, You Can Do It	Mexicano ¡Tú puedes!	José Estrada	Mexico
Mine	Mine	Atıf Yılmaz	Turkey
The Shooting Party	The Shooting Party	Alan Bridges	Great Britain
On the Threshold	Lars i porten	Leif Erlsboe	Norway
Åke and His World	Åke och hans värld	Allan Edwall	Sweden
The Boy Who Had Everything	The Boy Who Had Everything	Stephen Wallace	Australia
Prologue of the Undeclared War	Prologue of the Undeclared War	G. Jigjidsuren	Mongolia
Raffl	Raffl	Christian Berger	Austria
The Ring	Ringul	Sergiu Nicolaescu	Romania
Avaete, Seed of Revenge	Avaeté - Semente da Vingança	Zelito Viana	Brazil
Scalpel, Please	Skalpel, prosím	Jiří Svoboda	Czechoslovakia
Hopscotch	Pisingaña	Leopoldo Pinzón	Colombia
Soldier Sabur	Soldier Sabur	Abdul Latif	Afghanistan
Salt	Sogum	Shin Sang-ok	North Korea
Saaransh	Saaransh	Mahesh Bhatt	India
The Piper	El zamar	Atef El-Tayeb	Egypt
Reference	Kharakteristika	Christo Christov	Bulgaria
The Man Who Knew More	Mardi ke ziad midanest	Yadollah Samadi	Iran
Unseen Wonder	Čudo neviđeno	Živko Nikolić	Yugoslavia
A Joke of Destiny	Scherzo del destino in agguato dietro l'angolo come un brigante da strada	Lina Wertmüller	Italy

== Awards ==
- Golden Prizes:
  - Come and See by Elem Klimov
  - A Soldier's Story by Norman Jewison
  - The Descent of the Nine by Christos Siopahas
- Silver Prizes:
  - Unseen Wonder by Živko Nikolić
  - Woman in a Hat by Stanisław Różewicz
  - Avaete, Seed of Revenge by Zelito Viana
- Special Prizes:
  - Hell Train by Roger Hanin
  - Saaransh by Mahesh Bhatt
  - On the Threshold by Leif Erlsboe
- Prizes:
  - Best Actor: Lars Simonsen for Twist and Shout
  - Best Actor: Detlev Kügow for Wodzeck
  - Best Actress: Juli Básti for The Red Countess
  - Best Actress: Choi Eun-hee for Salt
- Prix FIPRESCI: Come and See by Elem Klimov
