= Johann Christian Woyzeck =

German soldier and murderer

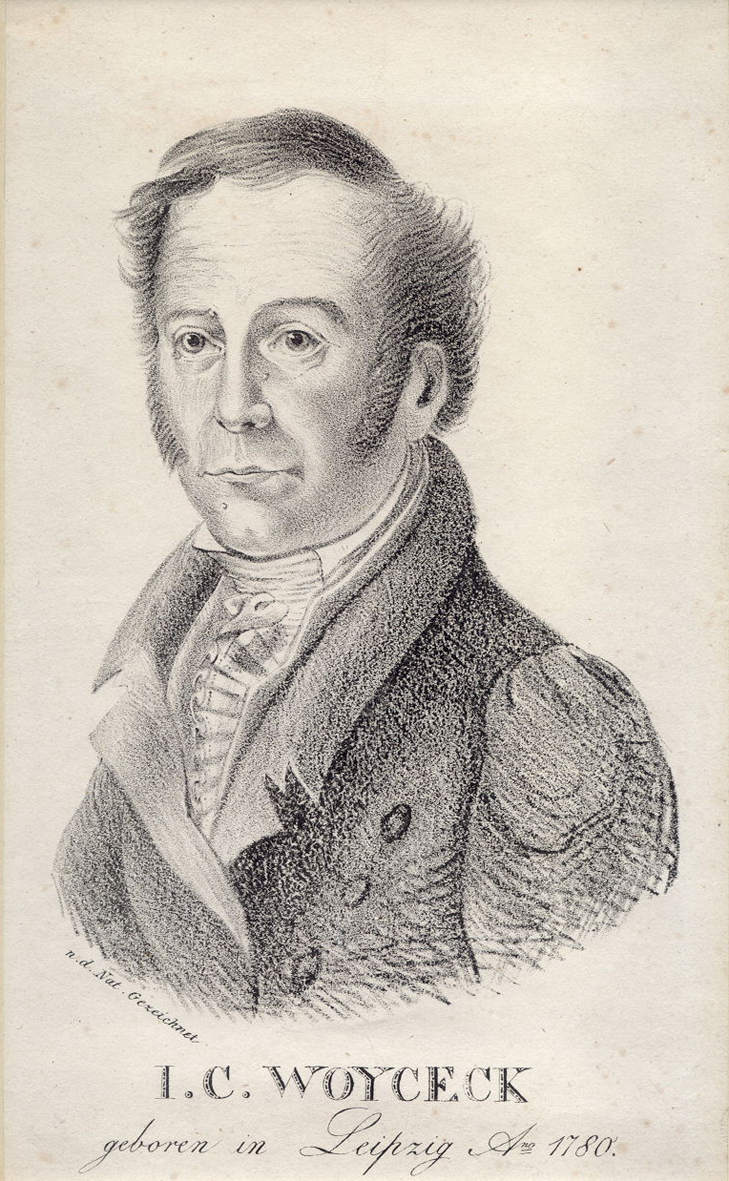
- Born: January 3, 1780; Leipzig, Electorate of Saxony
- Died: August 27, 1824 (aged 44); Leipzig, Kingdom of Saxony
- Citizenship: German

Johann Christian Woyzeck (born 3 January 1780 in Leipzig, Electorate of Saxony; executed 27 August 1824 in Leipzig, Kingdom of Saxony) was a German criminal.

He became famous for the murder of his mistress, Johanna Christiane Woost. This case is known for the long and elaborate report on the murderer's mental state that it spawned.

== Biography ==
Born and raised in Leipzig, he lost his mother at the age of 8 and his father at the age of 13: he began his apprenticeship with a barber and, in 1798, he began to travel until his enlistment. It was during this time that he had a son by a woman he did not marry, however. He returned to Leipzig in 1818 and began a relationship with Johanna Christiane Woost, widow of a famous surgeon. The relationship was undermined by the constant betrayals of Johanna, who used to hang out with soldiers with whom she amused herself. Out of jealousy, Woyzeck stabbed Johanna on 2 June 1821. Quickly arrested near the scene of the crime, Woyzeck immediately admitted the facts.

== The trial ==
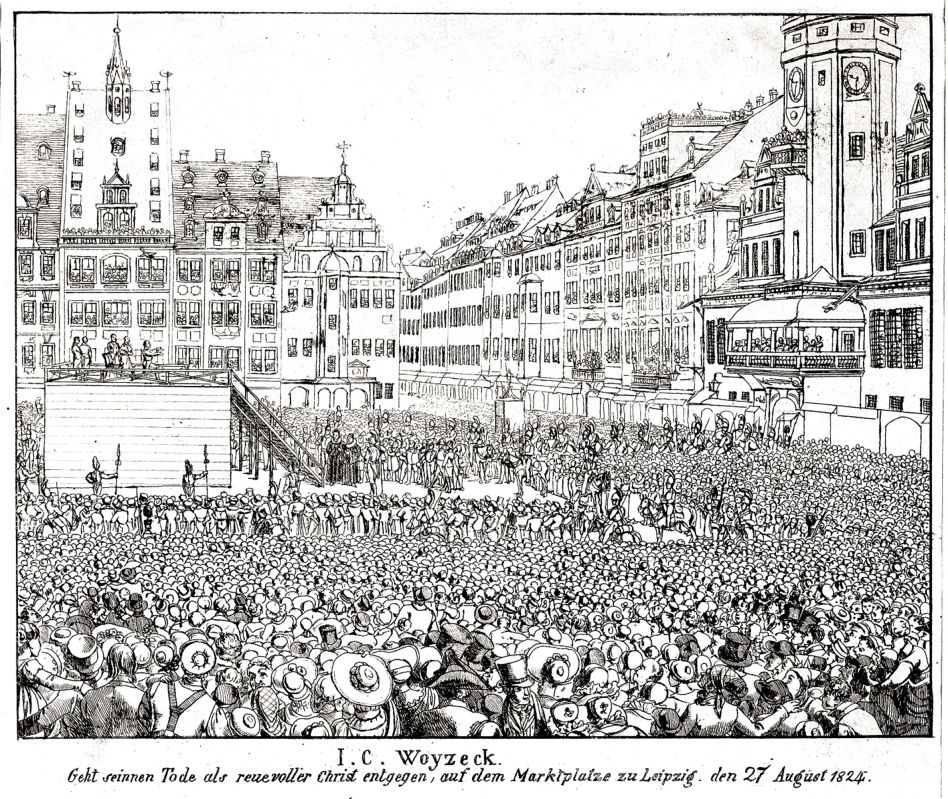
Public execution.

The legal proceeding lasted more than three years. At the request of Woyzeck's lawyer, psychiatrist Johann Christian August Clarus was commissioned to write a report on the murderer's mental state. After meeting with Woyzeck, Clarus argued that he was responsible for his actions, although he suffered from illnesses such as a major depressive disorder, schizophrenia and disorders such as depersonalization. Later, he was asked to write a second report. He met with Woyzeck several times again and reached the same conclusion as in his first report. Clarus's writings on Woyzeck's mental state were published under the title "Die Zurechnungsfähigkeit des Mörders Johann Christian Woyzeck".

On 11 October 1821 and, for the second time, after a long psychiatric controversy, on 12 July 1824, the court sentenced Woyzeck to death.

The public execution took place on 27 August 1824, on Leipzig's Markt market square. It was the city's first execution in thirty years and its last public execution. Amid a crowd of spectators who flocked to the scene, Woyzeck was beheaded.

== Works dedicated to Woyzeck ==
The incident, which had a wide national impact, inspired Georg Büchner's play fragment Woyzeck, written between 1836 and 1837 and left unfinished due to his death. This in turn was the basis for Alban Berg's opera Wozzeck, which is known as one of the most famous atonal operas to this date. Besides that, there are also several film adaptations, including the eponymous ones from 1979 by Werner Herzog and 1973 by Giancarlo Cobelli. The Swedish author Steve Sem-Sandberg addressed this historical case in "W. A Novel" (2022).
