= Zaborze, Cieszyn County =

Zaborze
- Village
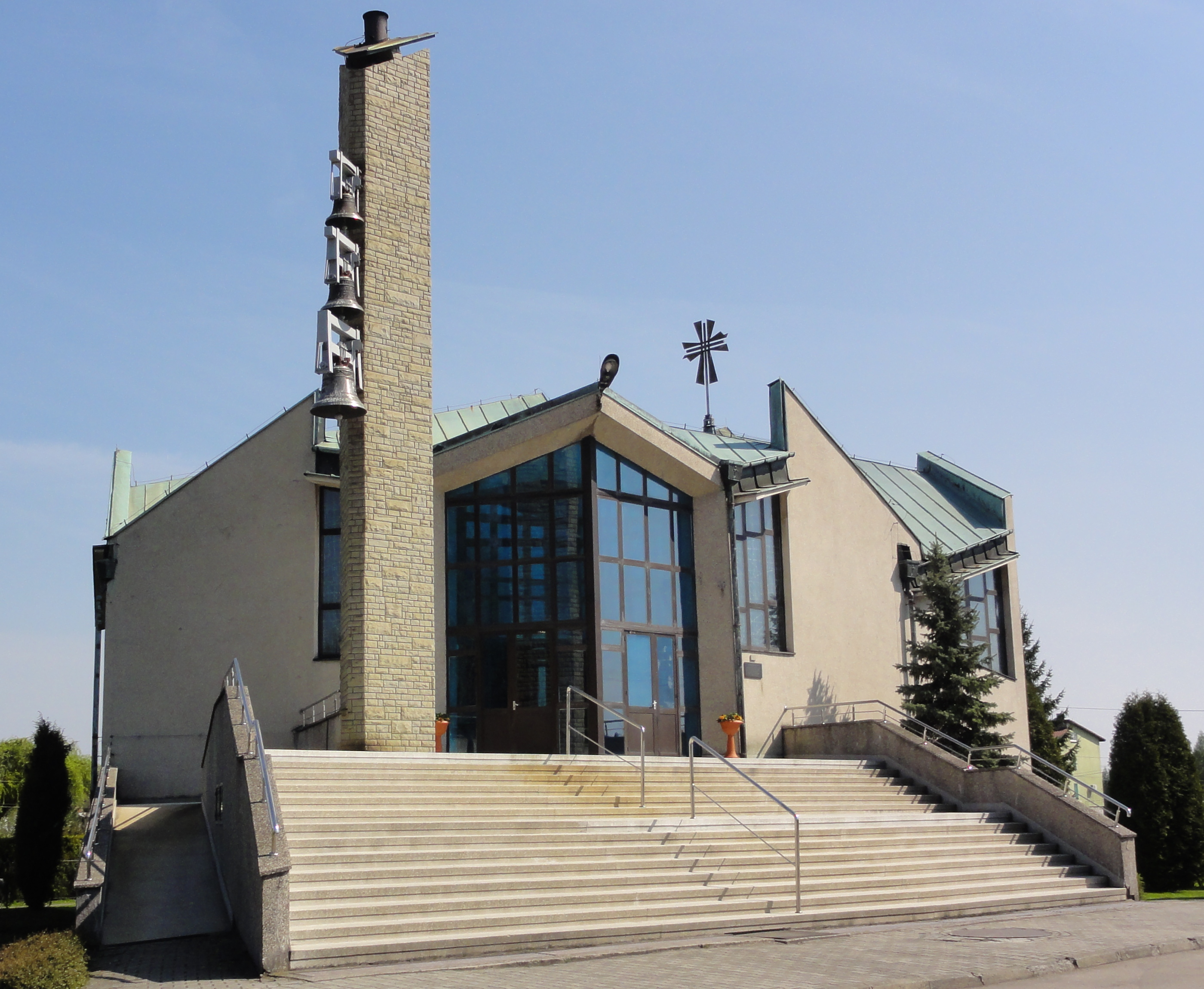
- Blessed Virgin Mary Church

- Coat of arms

- Location within Poland
- Coordinates: 49°52′17.5″N 18°48′35.24″E
- Country: Poland
- Voivodeship: Silesian
- County: Cieszyn
- Gmina: Chybie
- First mentioned: 1574

Government
  - Mayor: Jan Szostok

Area
  - Total: 5.92 km^{2} (2.29 sq mi)

Population (2008)
  - Total: 1,005
  - Density: 170/km^{2} (440/sq mi)
- Time zone: UTC+1 (CET)
  - Summer (DST): UTC+2 (CEST)
- Postal code: 43-520
- Car plates: SCI

Zaborze [zaˈbɔʐɛ] is a village in Gmina Chybie, Cieszyn County, Silesian Voivodeship, southern Poland. It lies in the historical region of Cieszyn Silesia.

== Etymology ==
The name is of topographic origin and literally means [a place] behind a bór (bór is a Polish name for temperate coniferous forest). In the 17th century it was known as Podpierściec (see a nearby village of Pierściec).

== History ==
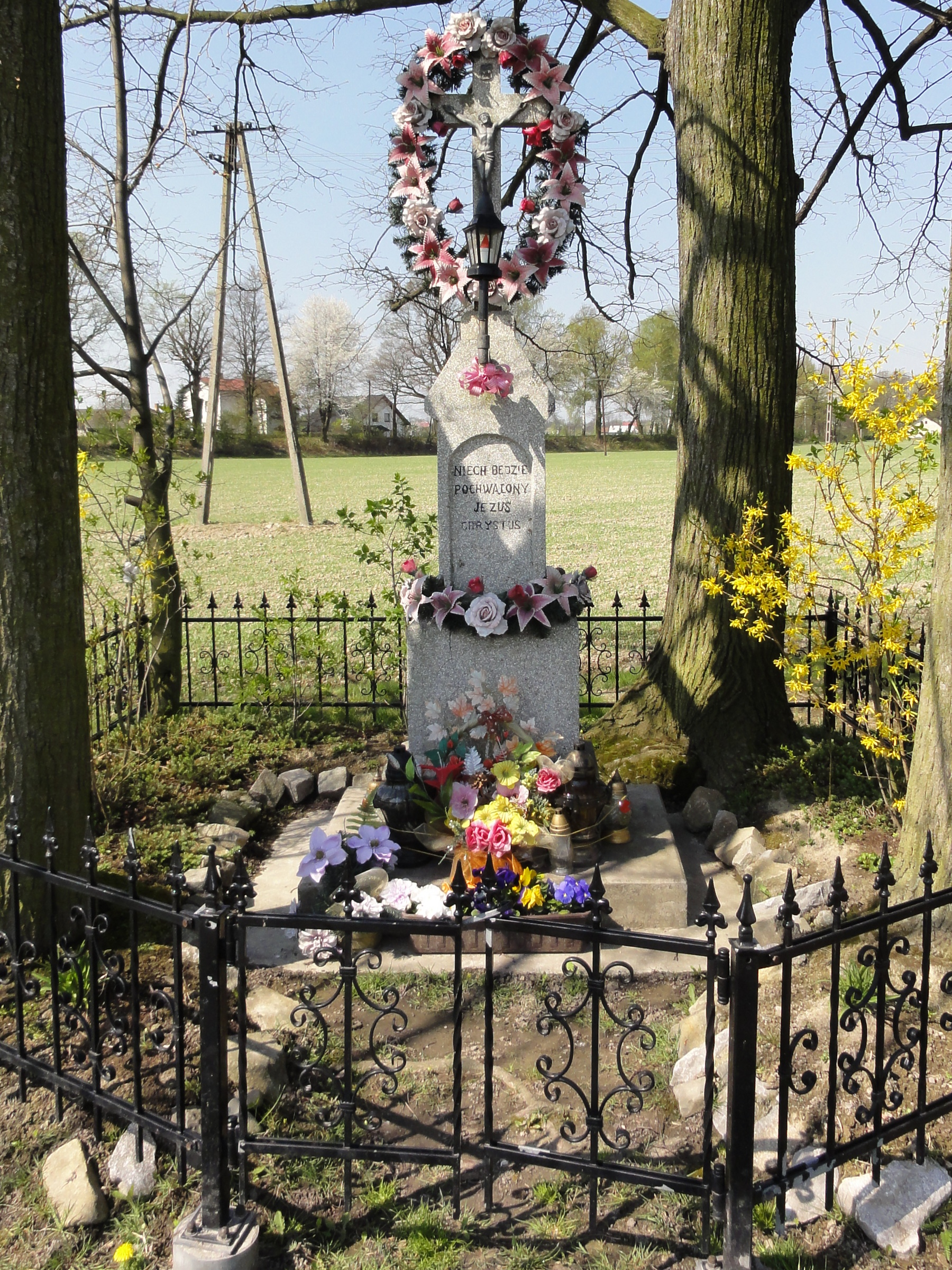
Wayside cross

The area became part of the emerging Polish state in the 10th century, and after its fragmentation into smaller duchies it formed part of the duchies of Silesia, Opole and Racibórz and Cieszyn, remaining under the rule of the Piast dynasty. It was first mentioned in a written document in 1574. Originally called Podpierściec as it lay close to Pierściec. Politically the village belonged then to the Duchy of Cieszyn, which by then became a fee of the Kingdom of Bohemia, which after 1526 became part of the Habsburg monarchy.

After Revolutions of 1848 in the Austrian Empire a modern municipal division was introduced in the re-established Austrian Silesia. The village as a municipality was subscribed to the political district of Bielsko and the legal district of Strumień. According to the censuses conducted in 1880, 1890, 1900 and 1910 the population of the municipality grew from 410 in 1880 to 450 in 1910 with a majority being native Polish-speakers (between 95.5%-99.6%) accompanied by a small German-speaking minority (at most 19 or 4.5% in 1890), in terms of religion in 1910 majority were Roman Catholics (64.3%), followed Protestants (35%) and 4 Jews. The village was also traditionally inhabited by Cieszyn Vlachs, speaking Cieszyn Silesian dialect.

After World War I, fall of Austria-Hungary, Polish–Czechoslovak War and the division of Cieszyn Silesia in 1920, it became again a part of Poland. It was then annexed by Nazi Germany at the beginning of World War II. After the war it was restored to Poland.
