= On the Threshold =

1984 film

- Directed by: Leif Erlsboe
- Written by: Leif Erlsboe
- Starring: Magnus E. Haslund
- Cinematography: Svein Krøvel
- Release date: 23 August 1984
- Running time: 90 minutes
- Country: Norway
- Language: Norwegian

On the Threshold (Norwegian: Lars i porten) is a 1984 Norwegian drama film directed by Leif Erlsboe. It was entered into the 14th Moscow International Film Festival where it won a Special Prize.

== Plot synopsis ==
An apartment house courtyard on the eastern outskirts of Oslo in the 1950s as seen through the eyes of 12-year-old Lars. His two best friends are his uncle and a prostitute who teaches him the tango.

== Cast ==
- Magnus E. Haslund as Lars
- Joachim Calmeyer as Tobby
- Anne Krigsvoll as Lill
- Peder Hamdahl Naess as Peter
- Anne Marie Ottersen as Mor
- Frode Rasmussen as Far
- Espen Skjønberg as Kalle
- Nils Ole Oftebro as Skolelæreren
- Johan Kjelsberg as Iversen
- Grete Nordrå as Fru Lund
