= Avaete, Seed of Revenge =

1985 film

- Film poster
- Directed by: Zelito Viana
- Written by: José Joffily; Zelito Viana
- Produced by: Zelito Viana
- Starring: Hugo Carvana; Renata Sorrah
- Cinematography: Edgar Moura
- Edited by: Gilberto Santeiro
- Music by: Egberto Gismonti
- Production companies: Mapa Filmes; Embrafilme
- Distributed by: Embrafilme
- Release dates: July 1985 (MIFF); 26 August 1985
- Running time: 110 minutes
- Country: Brazil
- Language: Portuguese

Avaete, Seed of Revenge (Portuguese: Avaeté: Semente da Vingança) is a 1985 Brazilian drama film directed by Zelito Viana. Based on the massacre of Cinta Larga people in the region of Fontanillas (now Juína, Mato Grosso), it was shot along the Juruena River, Mato Grosso, as well as on locations in São Paulo and Brasília. It was entered into the 14th Moscow International Film Festival where it won the Silver Prize.

== Cast ==
- Hugo Carvana
- Renata Sorrah
- Milton Rodrigues
- Macsuara Kadiwéu
- José Dumont
- Cláudio Mamberti
- Sérgio Mamberti
- Cláudio Marzo
- Nina de Pádua
- Jonas Bloch
- Chico Diaz
- Marcos Palmeira
