= Gustav Mesmer =

- Born: 16 January 1903; Altshausen, Upper Swabia; Germany
- Died: 25 December 1994 (aged 91); Buttenhausen; Germany
- Known for: human-powered flying machines

Gustav Mesmer (1903–1994) was a German inventor of experimental human-powered flying machines, often referred to in the press as "the Icarus of Lautertal." He has been championed by curators as an outsider artist, while his theories about improving aerodynamics through wing and sail piercings have been of interest to scientists.

== Biography ==
Born in Altshausen, Germany, on 16 January 1903, Gustav Mesmer was the sixth of 12 children. His schooling was cut short by the First World War, and at the age of 11 he began to work as a hired hand on various farms. Later, while working in the Untermarchtel monastery he was inspired by a Vincentian Sister to enter the Benedictine Order. He spent six years at the Benedictine monastery at Beuron, where he was known as Brother Alexander, but left shortly before taking his final vows.

Mesmer returned to Altshausen, where he lived with his parents and (in 1928) apprenticed himself to a carpenter. The following year, on 17 March, he disrupted a communion ceremony in the Altshausen church with a statement to the effect that it wasn't the blood of Christ that the churchgoers were being given, and that the whole ceremony was a fraud. He was forcibly removed from the church and taken back to his parents' house. The Mesmers’ family doctor considered his behavior a sign of mental illness of some kind and feared he might harm himself or others. Consequently, Mesmer was committed to the Bad Schussenried mental home with a diagnosis of schizophrenia of the paranoid type.

Mesmer wrote his family asking for their support in having him quickly released, but he received no answer because the Bad Schussenried administrators were not passing his letters on to the family. Frustrated, he broke out of Bad Schussenried and returned to Altshausen. His family didn't want him there, however, and sent him back. Over the years that followed, Mesmer continued to write his family expressing his wish to lead a normal life outside the mental home, and he broke out of the home many times. The Bad Schussenried staff considered his ideas about living a normal life delusional and did not take them seriously. Mesmer was to spend a total of 35 years in mental institutions before finally being released in 1964.

In January 1934, a new “Law for the Prevention of Offspring with Hereditary Diseases” came into force in Germany. This was the National Socialists’ first step toward the extermination of mental patients. At Bad Schussenried, many patients due to be discharged underwent forced sterilization; Mesmer was spared only because there was no intention of releasing him anytime soon. When the Second World War broke out, Bad Schussenried became a transit station on the route used to send people to be killed in the gas chambers of Grafeneck, itself a former mental institution. Mesmer was not put on any of the transport lists because he was considered useful as a hard worker.

In 1949, at his own request, he was transferred to the Weissenau Psychiatric Hospital near Altshausen. In Weissenau, Mesmer was granted greater freedom and slowly began to gain some recognition for his talent as an inventor. He still wanted to be released; his ambition was to open a basket weaver's shop and start a family. In 1962 he wrote an autobiography with the title Of One Who Spent Part of His Life in a Monastery and Part in a Psychiatric Institution.

In 1964, Mesmer was released from Weissenau at the behest of relatives in Rottenburg. He moved to an old people's home in Buttenhausen, where he spent most of the remainder of his life. He died on Christmas Day 1994, at age 91.

== Flying machines ==
At Bad Schussenried, Mesmer had worked in the book bindery. He would later say that while working in the bindery, he came across an article about an Austrian and a Frenchman who had an idea for making a flying machine using a bicycle for power. This idea fascinated him, and by 1932, according to a note in his patient file, he had begun to make drawings for flying machines of his own invention. He also built small models of these machines.

After the war ended, Mesmer learned basket weaving and continued to invent flying machines; he also created original musical instruments. When he moved to Buttenhausen in 1964, Mesmer was given access to a small workshop where he could actually build full-scale versions of his human-powered flying machines. This was an enormously productive period during which he not only built various flying machines but tested them out himself. Some of these machines were constructed around bicycles, but others were shoulder-harness rigs that required the wearer to use a tower, cliff, or other high place as a launch site. Elaborate constructions made largely of wood, fabric, and metal and often incorporating found materials, they were reminiscent of the flying machines built by Otto Lilienthal and other late 19th century aviation pioneers. The wings and sails were often pierced with numerous holes because Mesmer theorized that such holes could aid the flying machines’ aerodynamics (e.g. lift and stability). Among his best-known inventions are a shoulder harness constructed principally out of three umbrellas, and a bicycle with a set of rotors that turned it into a pedal-powered helicopter.

Mesmer became a familiar local sight, pedaling one of his altered bicycles down steep hills in an attempt to take off. When asked whether he had ever succeeded in taking off, he would reply that one of his machines had once carried him almost 50 meters but that unfortunately there had been no witnesses to the event. His inventions and expeditions earned him the affectionate local nickname of “the Icarus of Lautertal,” referencing the Lauter valley where Buttenhausen was located.

During this period, the German tabloids would occasionally run silly stories on Mesmer and his inventions, but others were taking them more seriously. Some scientists were intrigued with his pursuit of pierced-wing aircraft, while curators and artists championed his creations as the work of a self-taught or outsider artist. Articles on his work have appeared in the international art journal Kunstforum, as well as in one of the first issues of Raw Vision, an international journal of outsider art.

In the early 1980s, some of his friends organized well-received exhibitions of his work in Vienna, Mannheim, Lausanne, Ulm and elsewhere. In 1992, one of his flying bicycles was shown as part of a display entitled “The Dream of Flying” in the German pavilion at the World Exhibition in Seville. In 1993, a year before he died, Mesmer finally received acknowledgement in his home village when it mounted a showcase exhibition entitled “Gustav Mesmer: The Flying-Bicycle Engineer of Altshausen”. More recently, his work has been featured in the 2005 Kunstkoln art fair in Cologne, Germany, and in an episode of Wallace and Gromit's World of Invention. Short films have been made on his work by Hartmut Schoen (Gustav Mesmer: Der Flieger, 1981) and by Holger Reile (Gustav Mesmer: So frei sein wie die Vögel, 2000). The full-length movie Earthbound by Oliver Herbrich (1989) is inspired by Gustav Mesmer.
