= Henryk Machalica =

Polish actor

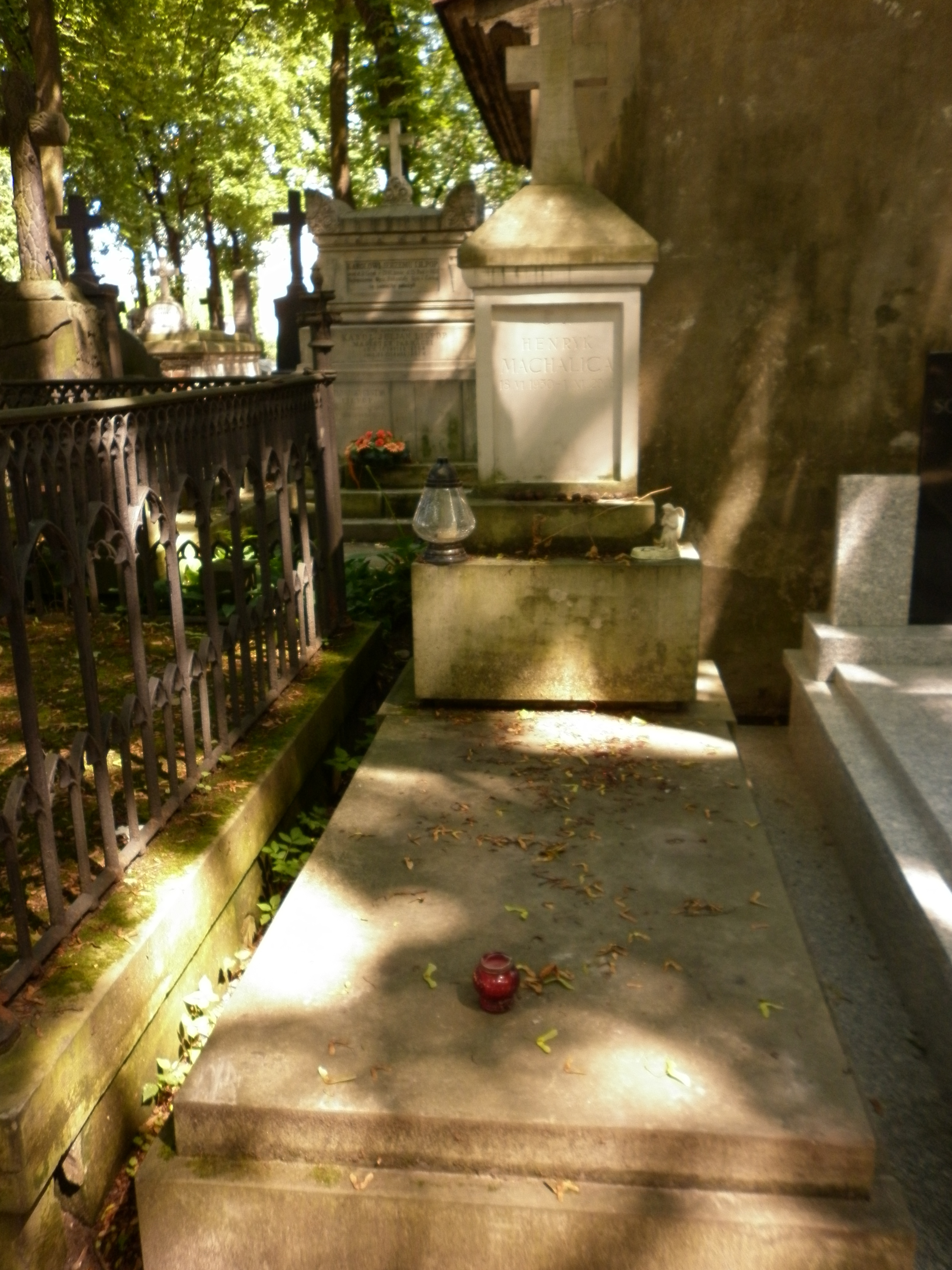
Grave of Henryk Machalica at Powązki Cemetery in Warsaw

Henryk Machalica (18 June 1930 in Chybie – 1 November 2003 in Warsaw) was a Polish film and stage actor.

== Selected filmography ==
- Woman in a Hat (1985)
- Boris Godunov (1986)
