= Woyzeck =

1836 play fragment by Georg Büchner

- Original language: German
- Written by: Georg Büchner
- Characters: Woyzeck; Marie; Andres; Louis; Margret; Karl; Captain; Doctor; Drum Major; Apprentices; Children; People; Grandmother

Premiere
- Date: 8 November 1913

Woyzeck (German pronunciation: [ˈvɔʏtsɛk]) is a stage play written by Georg Büchner. Büchner wrote the play between July and October 1836, yet left it incomplete at his death in February 1837. The play first appeared in 1877 in a heavily edited version by Karl Emil Franzos, and was first performed at the Residence Theatre in Munich on 8 November 1913.

Since then, Woyzeck has become one of the most influential and most often-performed German plays. Due to its unfinished nature, the play has inspired many diverging adaptations.

== Composition and textual history ==
Büchner probably began writing the play between June and September 1836. It is loosely based on the true story of Johann Christian Woyzeck, a Leipzig wigmaker who later became a soldier. In 1821, Woyzeck, in a fit of jealousy, murdered Christiane Woost, a 46-year-old widow with whom he had been living; he was later publicly beheaded. Büchner's work remained in a fragmentary state at the time of his early death in 1837.

The play was first made public in a heavily edited and augmented version by Karl Emil Franzos, who published it in periodicals in 1875 and 1877, before including it in his edition of Büchner's collected works in 1879. Franzos mistakenly understood the title character's name in the manuscripts as "Wozzeck"; the play bore that title in its first stage productions, and in subsequent published editions based on Franzos' version. The play was not performed until November 8, 1913 at the Residenztheater, Munich, where it was produced by Max Reinhardt.

Not only did Franzos have to cope with Büchner's "microscopically small" handwriting, but the pages had faded so badly that they had to be chemically treated to make the text decipherable at all. Franzos was unaware of the real-life basis of the drama. The play was first generally disseminated in 1921 through the appearance of a new edition, edited by Georg Witkowski, which introduced the corrected title Woyzeck.

== Plot summary ==
Franz Woyzeck, a lonely soldier stationed in a provincial German town, is living with Marie, the mother of his child who is not blessed by the church as the child was born out of wedlock. Woyzeck earns extra money for his family by performing menial jobs for the Captain and agreeing to take part in medical experiments conducted by the Doctor. At one of these experiments, the Doctor tells Woyzeck that he must eat nothing but peas. Woyzeck's mental health is breaking down and he begins to experience a series of apocalyptic visions. Meanwhile, Marie grows tired of Woyzeck and turns her attentions to a handsome drum major who, in an ambiguous scene taking place in Marie's bedroom, sleeps with her.

With his jealous suspicions growing, Woyzeck confronts the drum major, who beats Woyzeck up and humiliates him. Finally, Woyzeck stabs Marie to death by a pond. While a third act trial is claimed by some, notably A. H. J. Knight and Fritz Bergemann, to have been part of the original conception (what may be the beginning of a courtroom scene survives), the fragment, as left by Büchner, ends with Woyzeck disposing of the knife in the pond while trying to clean himself of the blood.

Here Franzos inserted the stage direction "ertrinkt" (he drowns), and although this emendation according to Knight "almost amounts to a forgery", most versions employ drowning as an appropriate resolution to the story.

== Notable productions ==
Since the original play was unfinished, many productions have taken liberties with the play's dialogue and scene order. Notable productions include:

- a 1913 first production at residenztheater, Munich, directed by Eugen Kilian
- a 1925 opera adaptation by Alban Berg
- a 1969 stage adaptation at the Royal Dramatic Theatre in Stockholm directed by Ingmar Bergman starring Thommy Berggren. The translation Bergman used was by Per Erik Wahlund, and in 1970 the translation was published by Sällskapet Bokvännerna, in Stockholm, with 24 woodcuts by the Swedish artist Torsten Billman.
- In the 1975 staging by the Classic Stage Company starring Ron Perlman, Christopher Martin "stressed the fluidity of the play's movement, and its sullen realism" according to Clive Barnes.
- a 1979 film directed by Werner Herzog
- a 1990 stage adaptation at Hartford Stage directed by Richard Foreman starring David Patrick Kelly
- a 1997 stage version by Keith Fowler. Fowler prepared his own translation for the Woyzeck he directed at the University of California, Irvine. In considering the traditional arrangements of scenes — whether to start with the scene in which Woyzeck is shaving his captain, the doctor's lecture, or when Woyzeck is in the woods and hears voices below the ground; and whether to end with Woyzeck's trial or his drowning — Fowler notes how each arrangement makes a different thematic statement, viz.:
  - Start: Shaving / End: Trial / Statement: Oppression of the lower classes by those in power.
  - Start: Woods / End: Drowning / Statement: Deranged Woyzeck destroys himself.
  - Start: Lecture / End: Drowning / Statement: Society disregards Woyzeck's humanity, eventually discards him...
  - Start: Lecture / End: Trial / Statement: ...or judges him.
  But, as Fowler also comments, what truly counts is "the totality of Büchner's world, for however the scenes are arranged, we will still have what G. Wilson Knight calls the 'burning core' of the drama...."
- production of the play by Vesturport, an Iceland-based theatre company, directed by Gísli Örn Garðarsson.
- A November 2002 Cape Cod Community College production, adapted and directed by Victor Warren
- a 2007 production at the Carnegie Mellon University School of Drama, Woyzeck was re-worked by Director Dan Rigazzi to take place in 1951 and reflect themes of racial pressure in the army. Also, with the help of the Carnegie Mellon University German Language Department, pieces of the original Clarus Report were translated to English and incorporated in the text and structure of the production.
- A play in 2009 at the Malthouse Theatre, Melbourne, Australia. Director Michael Kantor with Music by Nick Cave & Warren Ellis
- Production of the play by Toto Funds the Arts and Rafiki; adapted and directed by Anmol Vellani (India)
- A modernized version of Woyzeck played by the Belgian theatre group NTGent and Toneelgroep Ceremonia in fall 2010. The director, Eric De Volder, died the night after the première.
- Woyzeck, a 2010 Cameri Theater Tel-Aviv production, translated into Hebrew by Dori Parnas, edited and directed by Itay Tiran, who also stars as Woyzeck. Tiran's version sets the action in a psychiatric hospital and features Hebrew translations of songs by Tom Waits.
- A 2012 re-translation by Campbell Babson and directed by Ben Roberts took place at The Headwaters Theatre in Portland, Oregon.
- Woyzeck, a free adaptation by Neil LaBute that premiered at the Virginia Tech School of Performing Arts and Cinema on November 1, 2012 and ran through November 11, 2012. The adaptation was directed by 3-time OBIE winner Bob McGrath.
- A 2014 adaptation by Dylan Gamblin performed by Ghostlight Theater Company of New England in collaboration with die Karneval von Wahnsinn.
- An adaptation of the play set in 1980s Berlin, adapted by Jack Thorne, played at the Old Vic Theatre in 2017. It starred John Boyega as Woyzeck.
- In 2018 playwright Leo Butler's adaptation, according to The Stage newspaper, "preserves the absurd logic of the original amidst uber-contemporary references to drone strikes, automation, data privacy and fast food chains". It was directed by Roxana Silbert for the Birmingham Repertory Theatre, with a 100-strong cast.
- A 2018 adaptation by renowned ensemble physical theatre company Spies Like Us debuted at The Pleasance on August 1. The production was praised for its "contemporary intensity", and featured just five actors, five buckets and a crate.
- Woyzeck, Inc., a translation and adaption by Thomas Wolber and Logan Kovach, premiered at Ohio Wesleyan University in March 2021. The adaptation took the source material of the play and transported it to a distribution center owned by the fictional company Primedia, in a vocal criticism of Amazon.

In August 2024 Kraken Theatre Company staged Woyzeck with a new adaptation by Adam Bryx.

== Adaptations ==
The many adaptations of Woyzeck include:

- Wozzeck, the opera by Alban Berg, completed 1922, premiered in Berlin in December 1925.
- Wozzeck, the opera by Manfred Gurlitt, premiered in Bremen in April 1926.
- Wozzeck, the 1947 film by Georg C. Klaren
- Woyzeck, the 1969 play by Ingmar Bergman
- Woyzeck, the 1979 film by Werner Herzog
- Wodzeck, the 1984 film by Oliver Herbrich
- Different Drummer, the 1984 one-act ballet by Kenneth MacMillan
- Woyzeck, the 1994 film by János Szász
- Wozzeck, the mid-1990s novel by Ukrainian writer Yuriy Izdryk
- Woyzeck, the musical conceived by Robert Wilson, with lyrics and music by Tom Waits and Kathleen Brennan; the songs from which are on Waits's Blood Money album
- Re: Woyzeck, the modernized play by Jeremy Gable (in which Georg Büchner becomes a character in his own play)
- The Drowned Man: A Hollywood Fable, the production by Punchdrunk based on Woyzeck but set in a 1960s film studio. The production ran from 20 June 2013 – 6 July 2014.
- Please!, the performance and puppet show by Felicia Cooper, completed 2025, premiered in Minneapolis at the Red Eye Theater.
