= Stanisław Różewicz =

Polish film director and screenwriter

- Born: 16 August 1924; Radomsko, Poland
- Died: 9 November 2008 (aged 84); Warsaw, Poland
- Occupations: Film director, screenwriter
- Years active: 1947-1989

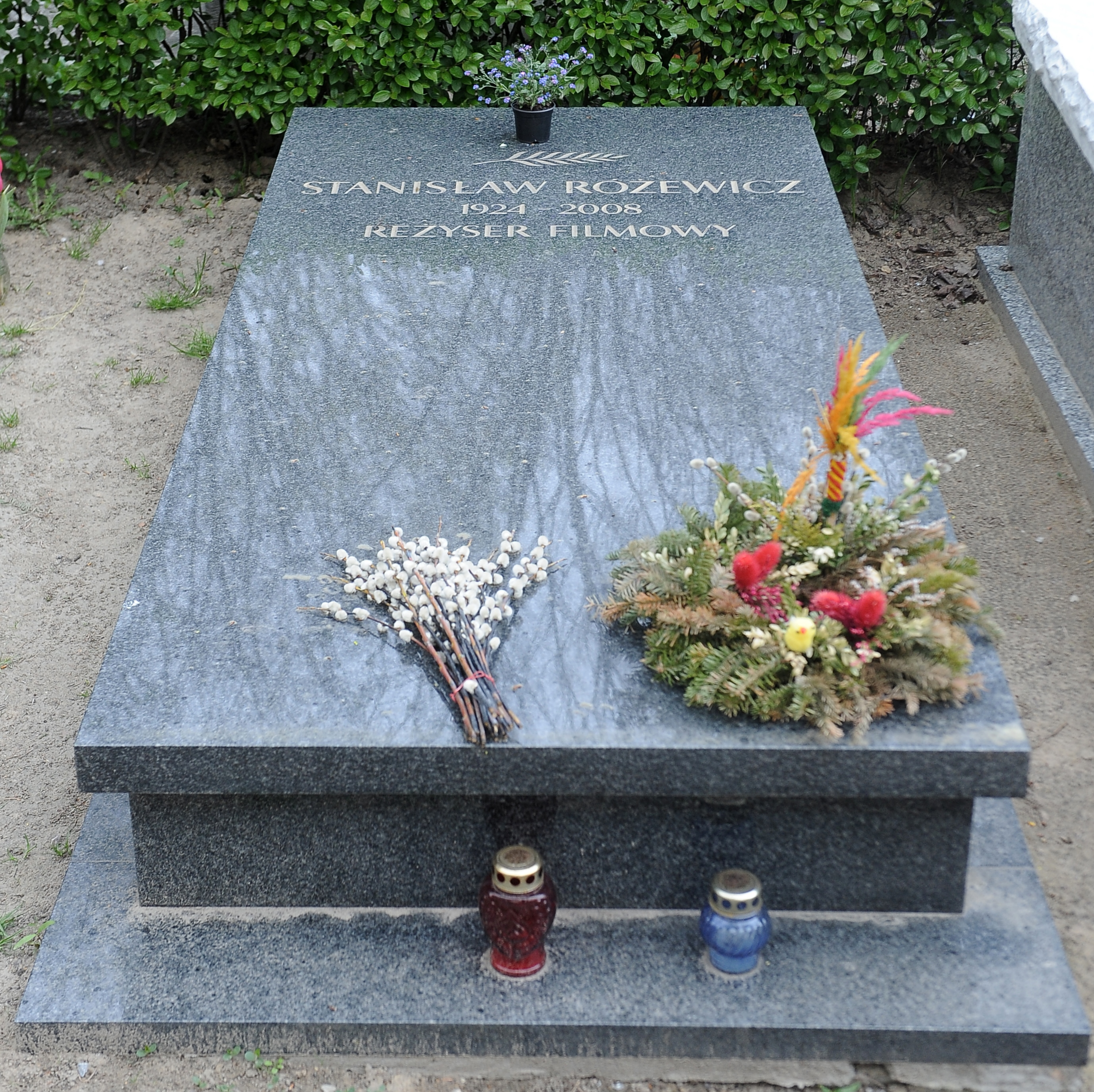
Grave of Stanisław Różewicz at the Military Powązki Cemetery in Warsaw

Stanisław Roch Różewicz (16 August 1924 – 9 November 2008) was a Polish film director and screenwriter. He directed 26 films between 1947 and 1989. His 1967 film Westerplatte was entered into the 5th Moscow International Film Festival where it won a Silver Prize. His 1985 film Woman in a Hat was entered into the 14th Moscow International Film Festival where it won the Silver Prize.

He was a younger brother of Polish poet, dramatist and writer Tadeusz Różewicz.

== Selected filmography ==
- Warsaw Premiere (1951)
- Free City (1958)
- Birth Certificate (1961)
- Westerplatte (1967)
- Passion (1977)
- Woman in a Hat (1985)
- Night Guest (1989)
