= Jan Kociniak =

Polish actor

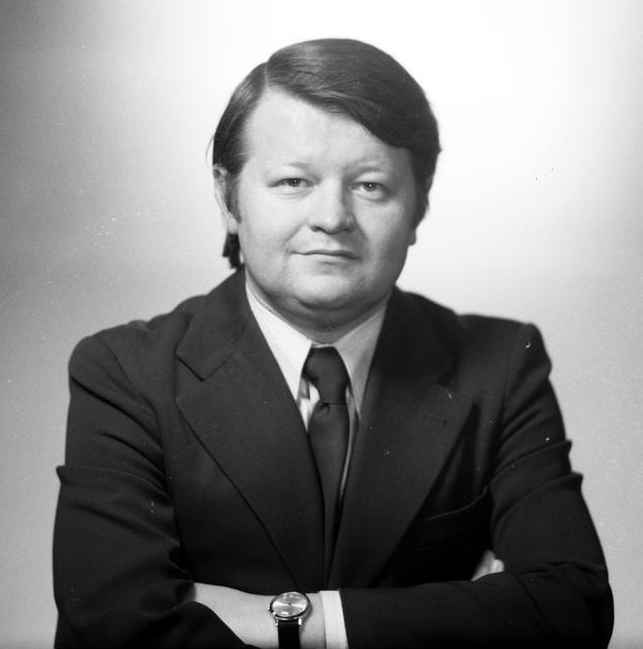
- Born: 8 November 1937; Stryj, Poland
- Died: 20 April 2007 (aged 69); Warsaw, Poland

Jan Kociniak (8 November 1937 – 20 April 2007) was a Polish film and theatre actor.

== Biography ==
Jan Kociniak was born in Stryj, Poland (now Ukraine). He graduated from The Warsaw Higher Theatrical School in 1961 and for most of his professional career he acted in The Atheneum Theatre in Warsaw. He was also well known for his performances in feature and TV films, as well as dubbing roles (such as Winnie the Pooh in the Polish-language version).

Kociniak was awarded the Order of Polonia Restituta.

== Filmography ==
=== Film ===
- 1960: Miejsce na ziemi as Kocoń
- 1963: Daleka jest droga
- 1963: Liczę na wasze grzechy as Adam Panek
- 1964: Wiano as Staszek's Pal
- 1965: The Saragossa Manuscript as Pacheco's servant (as J. Kociniak)
- 1966: Niewiarygodne przygody Marka Piegusa (TV Series) as Militiaman Stonoga
- 1966: Klub profesora Tutki (TV Series) as Son of the President
- 1967: The Night of the Generals as General Tanz's ordinance (uncredited)
- 1967: Kochajmy syrenki as A man who saw the "Pharaoh"
- 1967: Paryż - Warszawa bez wizy
- 1968: The Doll as Auctioneer
- 1971: Pierścień księżnej Anny as Pacholek krzyzacki
- 1971: Kłopotliwy gość as Paver
- 1975: Awans as Clerk Karczewiak
- 1977: Wielka podróż Bolka i Lolka as Jeremiah Pitsbury (voice)
- 1981: Teddy Bear as Militiaman
- 1984: Trzy młyny (TV Mini-Series)
- 1985: Woman in a Hat as Janitor
- 1985: Miłość z listy przebojów
- 1985: 5 dni z życia emeryta (TV Series) as Zbyszek
- 1985: Jezioro Bodeńskie as Klaus
- 1986: Sons and Comrades as Lieutenant Klaus
- 1987: Misja specjalna as Coach Driver
- 1987: Komediantka as Actor
- 1988-1990: The Master and Margarita (TV Series) as Bengalski
- 1991: Calls Controlled as Guard Wacek (voice, uncredited)
- 1997: Złotopolscy (TV Series) as Wolny
- 1997-1998: Z pianką czy bez (TV Series) as Kazimierz Suryn
- 1998: Królestwo Zielonej Polany. Powrót as Chairman's Advisor (voice)
- 1999: Dom (TV Series) as Staff manager of FSO
- 2001: Więzy krwi (TV Series)
- 2002-2006: Samo życie (TV Series) as Lucjan Michalak
- 2003: King Ubu as Ambassador of France
- 2007: Ryś as Postman (final film role)

=== Guest starring ===
- 1973: Man - Woman Wanted as Director's Assistant (uncredited)
- 1974–1977: Czterdziestolatek (TV Series) as Sports Club worker
- 1997–1998: Boża podszewka as Walukiewicz
- 1999: Na dobre i na złe (TV Series) as Henryk Krawczyk
- 2005: Boża podszewka II (TV Series) as Bartłomiej Walukiewicz

== Polish dubbing ==
- 1972: Strogoff as Alcide Jolivet
- 1974: Seventeen Moments of Spring as Klaus
- 1979–1982: Maya the Bee as Willy
- 1988: Yogi Bear as Car driver (First dub)
- 1988: Scooby-Doo and Scrappy-Doo as Floyd Hockins (1. Episode, First dub)
- 1988–1989: The Jetsons as Mr. Spacely (First dub)
- 1988: A Muppet Family Christmas as Statler
- 1989: The Magilla Gorilla Show as Mr. Peebles (First dub)
- 1992–1993: The New Adventures of Winnie the Pooh as Winnie the Pooh
- 1997: The Many Adventures of Winnie the Pooh as Winnie the Pooh
- 1997: The Rescuers as Bernard
- 1997: The Rescuers Down Under as Bernard (Second Dub)
- 1998: Cartoon All-Stars to the Rescue as Winnie the Pooh
- 1998: The 13 Ghosts of Scooby-Doo
- 1997: Pooh's Grand Adventure: The Search for Christopher Robin as Winnie the Pooh
- 2000: The Tigger Movie as Winnie the Pooh
- 2000: Rudolph the Red-Nosed Reindeer: The Movie as Leonard
- 2000: Boo to You Too! Winnie the Pooh as Winnie the Pooh
