= List of film auteurs =

This is a list of filmmakers who have been described as an auteur.

- Lenny Abrahamson
- Moussa Sene Absa
- Tengiz Abuladze
- Kunle Afolayan
- Chantal Akerman
- Fatih Akin
- Robert Aldrich
- Woody Allen
- Pedro Almodóvar
- Lisandro Alonso
- Robert Altman
- Alejandro Amenábar
- Lindsay Anderson
- Paul Thomas Anderson
- Paul W. S. Anderson
- Wes Anderson
- Roy Andersson
- Theo Angelopoulos
- Kenneth Anger
- Hideaki Anno
- Michelangelo Antonioni
- Gregg Araki
- Denys Arcand
- Dario Argento
- Gillian Armstrong
- Andrea Arnold
- Darren Aronofsky
- Dorothy Arzner
- Hal Ashby
- Olivier Assayas
- Ari Aster
- Héctor Babenco
- Sean Baker
- Ralph Bakshi
- Noah Baumbach
- Mario Bava
- Michael Bay
- Jacques Becker
- Ingmar Bergman
- Busby Berkeley
- Bernardo Bertolucci
- Luc Besson
- Bahram Beyzai
- Sanjay Leela Bhansali
- Susanne Bier
- Kathryn Bigelow
- Alice Guy Blaché
- Neill Blomkamp
- Anna Boden and Ryan Fleck
- Peter Bogdanovich
- Bertrand Bonello
- Bong Joon-ho
- John Boorman
- Frank Borzage
- Danny Boyle
- Stan Brakhage
- Neil Breen
- Catherine Breillat
- Robert Bresson
- Lino Brocka
- Albert Brooks
- Mel Brooks
- Luis Buñuel
- Charles Burnett
- Tim Burton
- James Cameron
- Jane Campion
- Frank Capra
- Leos Carax
- Marcel Carné
- John Carpenter
- John Cassavetes
- Nuri Bilge Ceylan
- Claude Chabrol
- Gurinder Chadha
- Charlie Chaplin
- Damien Chazelle
- Michael Cimino
- Souleymane Cissé
- René Clair
- Alan Clarke
- René Clément
- Henri-Georges Clouzot
- Jean Cocteau
- Michaela Coel
- Coen brothers
- Ryan Coogler
- Francis Ford Coppola
- Sofia Coppola
- Brady Corbet
- Panos Cosmatos
- Pedro Costa
- Wes Craven
- David Cronenberg
- Alfonso Cuarón
- George Cukor
- Adam Curtis
- Daniels (directors)
- Lee Daniels
- Joe Dante
- Dardenne brothers
- Jules Dassin
- Terence Davies
- Manoel de Oliveira
- Brian De Palma
- Vittorio De Sica
- Josephine Decker
- Guillermo del Toro
- Cecil B. DeMille
- Jonathan Demme
- Jacques Demy
- Claire Denis
- Maya Deren
- Arnaud Desplechin
- Lav Diaz
- Andrew Dominik
- Stanley Donen
- Alexander Dovzhenko
- Julia Ducournau
- Quentin Dupieux
- Marguerite Duras
- Clint Eastwood
- Blake Edwards
- Sergei Eisenstein
- Robert Eggers
- Atom Egoyan
- Adam Elliot
- Victor Erice
- Asghar Farhadi
- Rainer Werner Fassbinder
- Federico Fellini
- Emerald Fennell
- Abel Ferrara
- Louis Feuillade
- David Fincher
- Robert J. Flaherty
- John Ford
- Miloš Forman
- Bob Fosse
- Jesús Franco
- John Frankenheimer
- William Friedkin
- Lucio Fulci
- Samuel Fuller
- Bi Gan
- Alex Garland
- Philippe Garrel
- Costa-Gavras
- Haile Gerima
- Alexei German
- Greta Gerwig
- Ritwik Ghatak
- Terry Gilliam
- Sidney Gilliat
- Vince Gilligan
- Jonathan Glazer
- Jean-Luc Godard
- Michel Gondry
- Philippe Grandrieux
- James Gray
- Peter Greenaway
- Jean Grémillon
- D. W. Griffith
- Luca Guadagnino
- Guan Hu
- Michael Haneke
- Hal Hartley
- Howard Hawks
- Todd Haynes
- Monte Hellman
- Oliver Hermanus
- Don Hertzfeldt
- Werner Herzog
- Walter Hill
- Alfred Hitchcock
- Joanna Hogg
- Agnieszka Holland
- Med Hondo
- Hong Sang-soo
- Hou Hsiao-hsien
- John Hughes
- John Huston
- Hu Bo
- King Hu
- Kon Ichikawa
- Alex de la Iglesia
- Shohei Imamura
- Alejandro González Iñárritu
- Shunji Iwai
- Peter Jackson
- Miklós Jancsó
- Derek Jarman
- Jim Jarmusch
- Barry Jenkins
- Anders Thomas Jensen
- Jean-Pierre Jeunet
- Jia Zhangke
- Alejandro Jodorowsky
- Rian Johnson
- Chuck Jones
- Spike Jonze
- Mikhail Kalatozov
- Anurag Kashyap
- Charlie Kaufman
- Aki Kaurismäki
- Elia Kazan
- Buster Keaton
- Tunde Kelani
- Marlen Khutsiev
- Abbas Kiarostami
- Krzysztof Kieslowski
- Kim Ki-duk
- Takeshi Kitano
- Elem Klimov
- Masaki Kobayashi
- Satoshi Kon
- Hirokazu Kore-eda
- Stanley Kubrick
- Akira Kurosawa
- Emir Kusturica
- Stanley Kwan
- John Landis
- Fritz Lang
- Yorgos Lanthimos
- Claude Lanzmann
- John Lasseter
- Frank Launder
- David Lean
- Ang Lee
- Spike Lee
- Mike Leigh
- Sergio Leone
- Jerry Lewis
- Joseph H. Lewis
- Richard Linklater
- Ken Loach
- Phil Lord and Christopher Miller
- Chuck Lorre
- Joseph Losey
- Lou Ye
- David Lowery (director)
- Ernst Lubitsch
- George Lucas
- Baz Luhrmann
- David Lynch
- Guy Maddin
- Mohsen Makhmalbaf
- Terrence Malick
- Louis Malle
- Djibril Diop Mambéty
- Joseph L. Mankiewicz
- Anthony Mann
- Michael Mann
- Lucrecia Martel
- Chris Marker
- Sergio Martino
- Elaine May
- Albert and David Maysles
- Leo McCarey
- Steve McQueen
- Adam McKay
- Jonas Mekas
- Georges Méliès
- Sam Mendes
- Jean-Pierre Melville
- Russ Meyer
- Nancy Meyers
- Takashi Miike
- George Miller
- Mike Mills
- Vincente Minnelli
- Hayao Miyazaki
- Kenji Mizoguchi
- Mario Monicelli
- João César Monteiro
- Lukas Moodysson
- Michael Moore
- Nanni Moretti
- Errol Morris
- Cristian Mungiu
- Kira Muratova
- F. W. Murnau
- Amir Naderi
- Mikio Naruse
- Mark Neveldine and Brian Taylor
- Jeff Nichols
- Mike Nichols
- Gaspar Noé
- Christopher Nolan
- Nobuhiko Obayashi
- Ermanno Olmi
- Max Ophüls
- Nagisa Ōshima
- Ruben Östlund
- François Ozon
- Yasujirō Ozu
- G.W. Pabst
- Alan J. Pakula
- Marcel Pagnol
- Jafar Panahi
- Sergei Parajanov
- Park Chan-wook
- Nick Park
- Trey Parker and Matt Stone
- Pier Paolo Pasolini
- Alexander Payne
- Jordan Peele
- Sam Peckinpah
- Arthur Penn
- Alex Ross Perry
- Christian Petzold
- Maurice Pialat
- Roman Polanski
- Sydney Pollack
- Sarah Polley
- Sally Potter
- Michael Powell
- Otto Preminger
- Cristi Puiu
- Brothers Quay
- Bob Rafelson
- Sam Raimi
- Lynne Ramsay
- Mani Ratnam
- Nicholas Ray
- Satyajit Ray
- Carol Reed
- Nicolas Winding Refn
- Kelly Reichardt
- Jason Reitman
- Jean Renoir
- Alain Resnais
- Matt Reeves
- Carlos Reygadas
- Tony Richardson
- Leni Riefenstahl
- Jacques Rivette
- Glauber Rocha
- Nicolas Roeg
- Éric Rohmer
- Alice Rohrwacher
- George A. Romero
- Roberto Rossellini
- Raúl Ruiz
- Björn Runge
- Ken Russell
- David O. Russell
- Safdie brothers
- Walter Salles
- Isabel Sandoval
- John Sayles
- John Schlesinger
- Julian Schnabel
- Paul Schrader
- Céline Sciamma
- Martin Scorsese
- Ridley Scott
- Tony Scott
- Ousmane Sembène
- Albert Serra
- Sohrab Shahid-Saless
- Will Sharpe
- Lynn Shelton
- Larisa Shepitko
- Jane Schoenbrun
- Daryush Shokof
- Trey Edward Shults
- M. Night Shyamalan
- Don Siegel
- Tarsem Singh
- Douglas Sirk
- Abderrahmane Sissako
- Victor Sjöström
- Kevin Smith
- Michael Snow
- Zack Snyder
- Steven Soderbergh
- Alexander Sokurov
- Todd Solondz
- Sion Sono
- Aaron Sorkin
- Paolo Sorrentino
- Steven Spielberg
- George Stevens
- Oliver Stone
- Straub–Huillet
- Barbra Streisand
- John Sturges
- Preston Sturges
- Elia Suleiman
- Seijun Suzuki
- Jan Švankmajer
- Isao Takahata
- Quentin Tarantino
- Andrei Tarkovsky
- Béla Tarr
- Frank Tashlin
- Jacques Tati
- Bertrand Tavernier
- Julie Taymor
- Johnnie To
- Jacques Tourneur
- Jeff Tremaine
- Joachim Trier
- François Truffaut
- Tsai Ming-liang
- Tsui Hark
- Shinya Tsukamoto
- Edgar G. Ulmer
- Gus Van Sant
- Agnès Varda
- Paul Verhoeven
- Dziga Vertov
- King Vidor
- Jean Vigo
- Denis Villeneuve
- Thomas Vinterberg
- Luchino Visconti
- Josef von Sternberg
- Erich von Stroheim
- Lars von Trier
- The Wachowskis
- Andrzej Wajda
- Raoul Walsh
- Wang Bing
- Vincent Ward
- Alex van Warmerdam
- John Waters
- Lois Weber
- Apichatpong Weerasethakul
- Peter Weir
- Orson Welles
- William A. Wellman
- Wim Wenders
- Lina Wertmüller
- James Whale
- Billy Wilder
- Michael Winterbottom
- Tommy Wiseau
- Frederick Wiseman
- Wong Kar-wai
- John Woo
- Edgar Wright
- Joe Wright
- Edward Yang
- Robert Zemeckis
- Zhang Yimou
- Chloe Zhao
- Rob Zombie
- Andrzej Żuławski
- Valerio Zurlini
- Andrey Zvyagintsev
- Terry Zwigoff
