= List of space art related books =

This is a list of books related to space art.

- The Art of Space Ron Miller, 2014
- Art in Orbit: Art Objects and Spaceflight, Barbara Brownie, Bloomsbury: London, 2025
- The Beauty of Space Edited by Jon Ramer, foreword by Alan Bean, 2011
- Blueprint for Space Frederick I. Ordway, III & Randy Liebermann, eds
- Celestial Visitations: The Art of Gilbert Williams Pomegranate artbooks, 1979
- The Conquest of Space Chesley Bonestell, Willy Ley, Viking Press, 1950
- Cosmic Art Ramond & Lila Piper Hawthorne Books, 1975
- Cycles of Fire William Hartmann & Ron Miller, Aurium Press, 1987
- Eyewitness to Space, from the Art Program of the National Aeronautics and Space Administration (1963 to 1969).' Foreword by J. Carter Brown. Preface by Thomas O. Paine. New York: H.N. Abrams
- Fire and Ice: A History Of Comets in Art. Roberta J. M. Olson. Walker and Company New York
- The Fires Within: Volcanoes on Earth and Other Planets David A. Hardy & John Murray Dragon's World, 1991
- Futures: 50 Years in Space David A. Hardy & Patrick Moore AAPPL 2004
- The Grand Tour: A Traveler's Guide to the Solar System Ron Miller and William Hartmann, Workman Publishers, 1981, 1993, 2005
- Imagining Space Achievements*Predictions*Possibilities 1950-2050 Chronicle Books 2001
- Infinite Worlds Vincent Di Fate
- Infinite Worlds: An Illustrated Voyage to Planets Beyond Our Sun Ray Villard & Lynette Cook, University of California Press, 2005
- In the Stream of Stars: The Soviet-American Space Art Book Sokolov, Miller, Myagkov, Hartmann, International Association for the Astronomical Arts
- NASA ART 50 Years of Exploration James Dean & Bertram Ulrich Abrams, 2008
- Our World in Space Robert McCall & Isaac Asimov, New York Graphic Society LTD 1974
- Out of the Cradle: Exploring the Frontiers beyond Earth, William K. Hartmann, Ron Miller and Pamela Lee (Workman Publishing, 1984)
- Space Art - Starlog photo guidebook, Ron Miller - Starlog Magazine, 1978
- Space Art: How to draw and paint planets, moons and landscapes of alien worlds Michael Carroll, Watson Guptill publishers 2007
- Star Struck: One Thousand Years of the art of Science and Astronomy Ronald Brashear Daniel Lewis 2001 Univ. of Washington Press
- Sur Les Autres Mondes Lucien Rudaux, Librairie Larousse, 1937
- The Impact of American and Russian Cosmism on the Representation of Space Exploration in 20th Century American and Soviet Space Art Kornelia Boczkowska, Wydawnictwo Naukowe UAM, 2016
- Universe Don Dixon Houghton Mifflin 1981
- Universe Guidebook, The Celestial Zoo, Pablo Carlos Budassi, 2020
- Visions of Spaceflight Images from the Ordway collection Frederick I. Ordway III Four Walls Eight Windows, New York 2000
- Visions of Space David A. Hardy Paper Tiger 1989
- Worlds Beyond: The Art of Chesley Bonestell Ron Miller & Frederick C. Durant, III

== See also ==
- List of space artists
