= List of space artists =

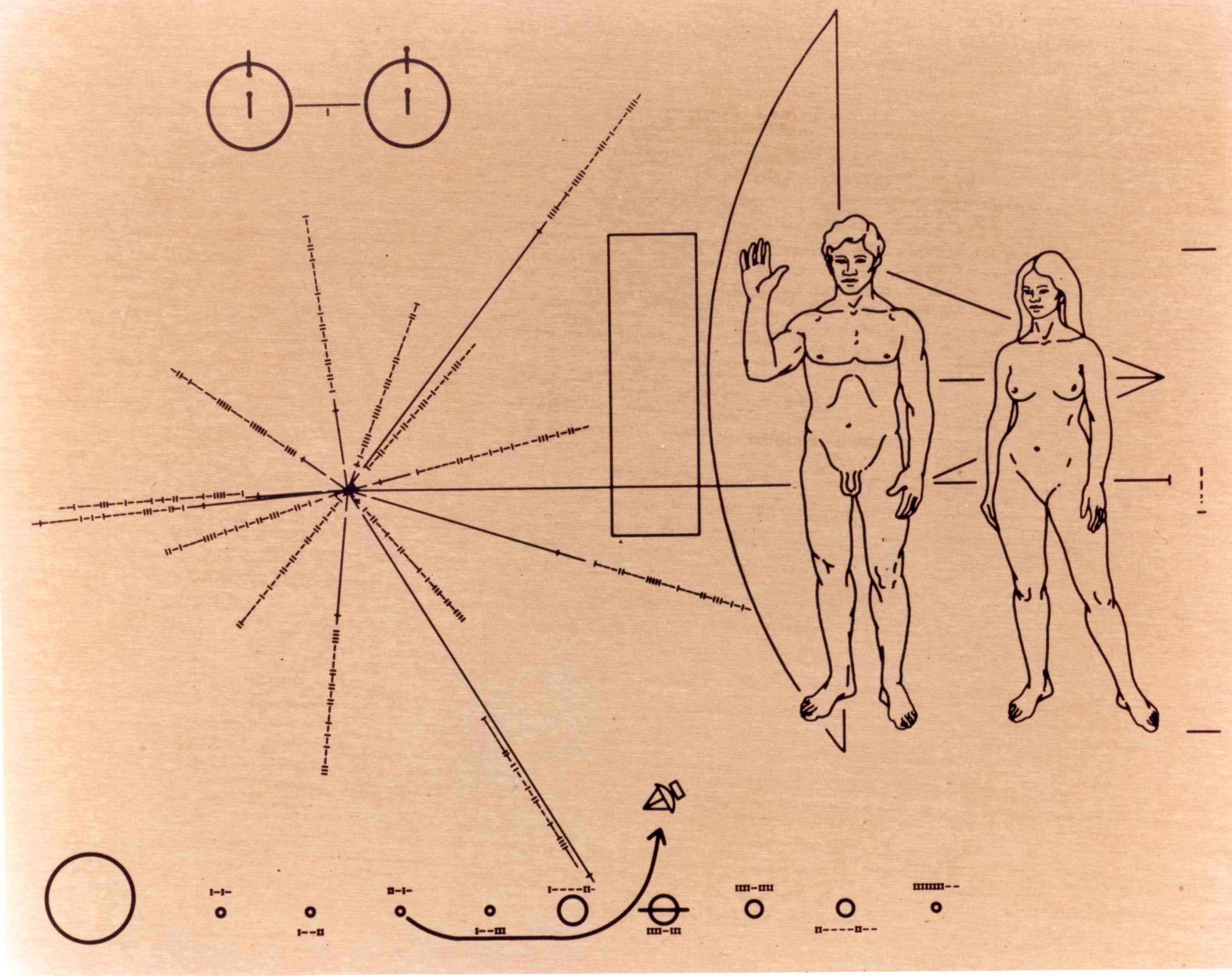
The illustration on the Pioneer plaque

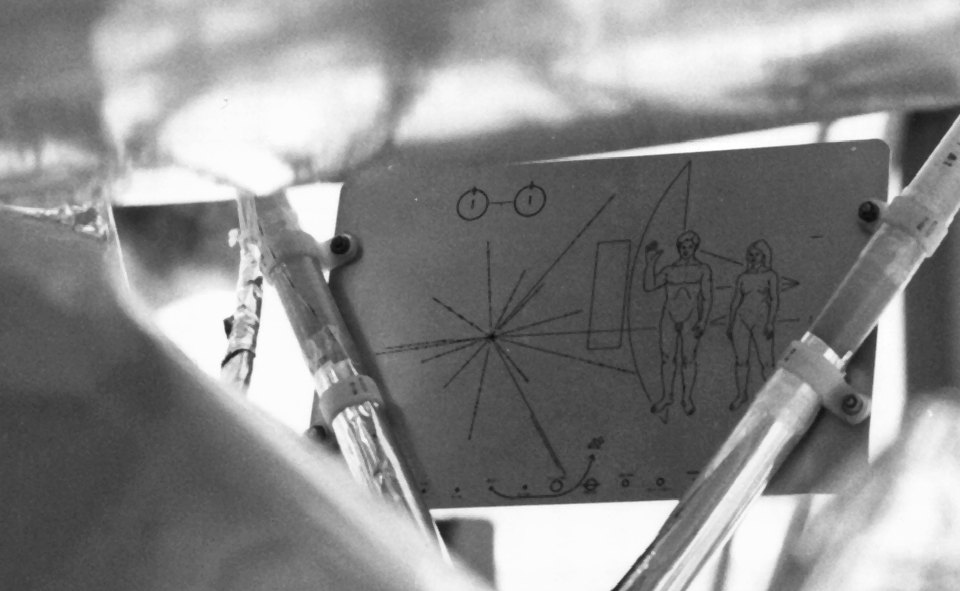
The plaque attached to Pioneer 10

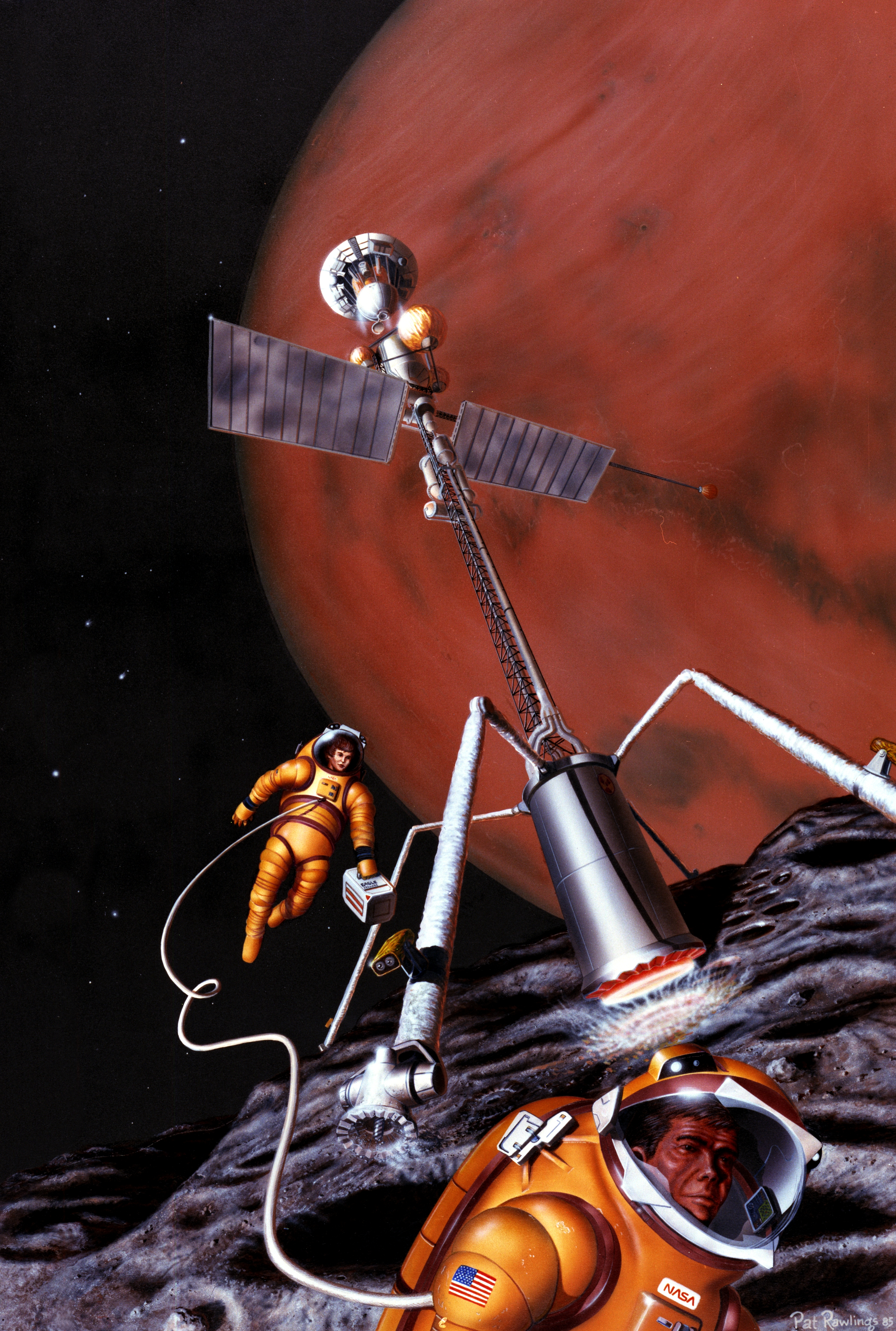
Fuel is mined from Phobos with the help of a nuclear reactor. (Pat Rawlings, 1986)

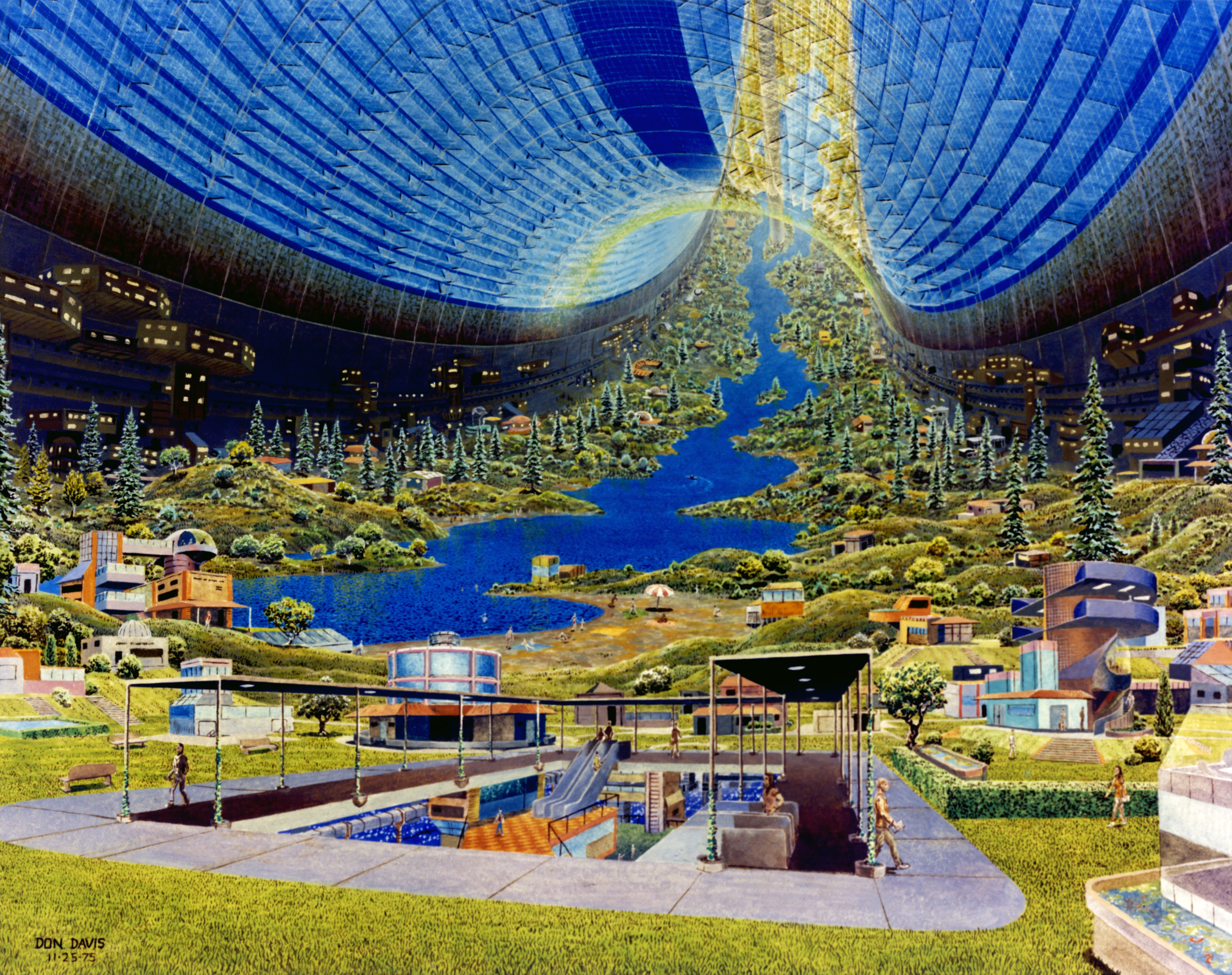
Interior of a Stanford Torus as painted by Don Davis in the 1970s

This list of space artists includes artists who produce art and music about space and spaceflight or have artwork in space.

== Artists ==
- Howard Russell Butler (1856–1934)
- Chesley Bonestell (1888–1986)
- Paul Calle (1929–2010)
- Ann Druyan (born 1949)
- Michael Carroll
- Jack Coggins
- Vincent Di Fate (born 1945)
- David Bowie (1947–2016)
- Don Davis (born 1952)
- Joe Davis (born 1950)
- Don Dixon (born 1951)
- Bob Eggleton (born 1960)
- Danny Flynn
- Mikael Genberg (born 1963 or 1964)
- David A. Hardy (born 1936)
- Joby Harris (born 1975)
- William K. Hartmann (born 1939)
- Jon Lomberg (born 1948)
- Robert McCall (Bob McCall) (1919–2010)
- Syd Mead (1933–2019)
- Ron Miller (born 1947)
- Theophile Moreux
- Nahum (born 1979)
- Amy Karle (born 1980)
- Andreas Nottebohm (born 1944)
- Ludek Pesek (1919–1999)
- Frank Pietronigro
- Kim Poor (1952–2017)
- Pat Rawlings (born 1955)
- Lucien Rudaux (1874–1947)
- John Schoenherr
- Alex Schomburg
- Ingo Swann
- Yuri Pavlovich Shvets (1902–1972)
- Rick Sternbach (born 1951)
- Étienne Léopold Trouvelot
- Trevor Paglen
- Eduardo Kac

== Astronaut space artists ==
- Alan Bean
- Alexei Leonov
- Sian Proctor
- Nicole Stott

== See also ==
- List of space art related books
