= STS-1 =

First Space Shuttle mission, first orbital flight of the Space Shuttle Columbia

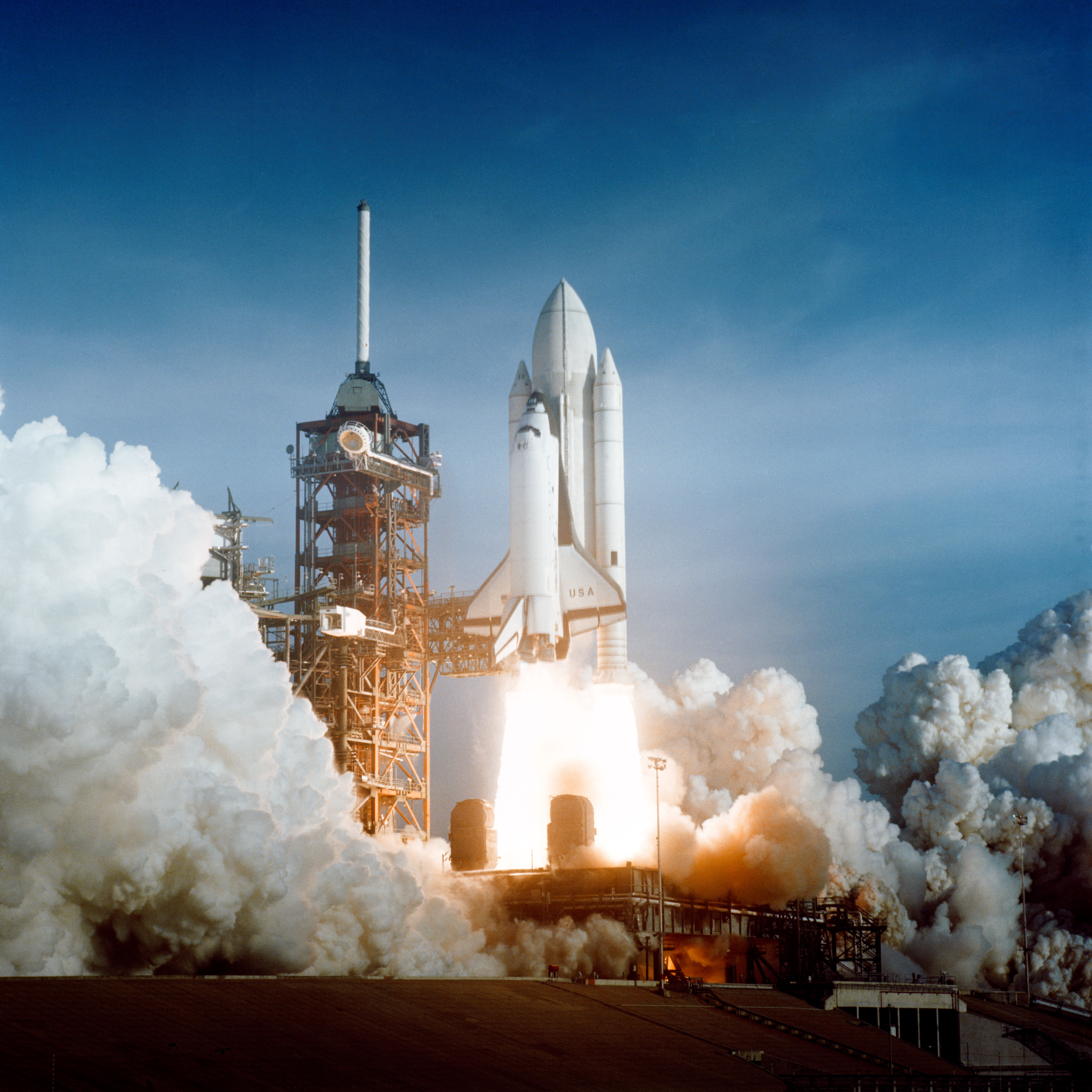
- STS-1 lifts off from the Kennedy Space Center on April 12, 1981, the first orbital launch of the Space Shuttle program.
- Names: Space Transportation System-1
- Mission type: Flight test
- Operator: NASA
- COSPAR ID: 1981-034A
- SATCAT no.: 12399
- Mission duration: 2 days, 6 hours, 20 minutes, 53 seconds
- Distance travelled: 1,729,348 km (1,074,567 mi)
- Orbits completed: 36

Spacecraft properties
- Spacecraft: Space Shuttle Columbia

Crew
- Crew size: 2
- Members: John Young; Robert Crippen

Start of mission
- Launch date: April 12, 1981, 12:00:04 UTC (07:00:04 am EST)
- Launch site: Kennedy, LC-39A
- Contractor: Rockwell International

End of mission
- Landing date: April 14, 1981, 18:20:57 UTC (10:20:57 am PST)
- Landing site: Edwards, Runway 23

Orbital parameters
- Reference system: Geocentric orbit
- Regime: Low Earth orbit
- Perigee altitude: 246 km (153 mi)
- Apogee altitude: 274 km (170 mi)
- Inclination: 40.30°
- Period: 89.88 minutes

Instruments
- Development Flight Instrumentation (DFI)
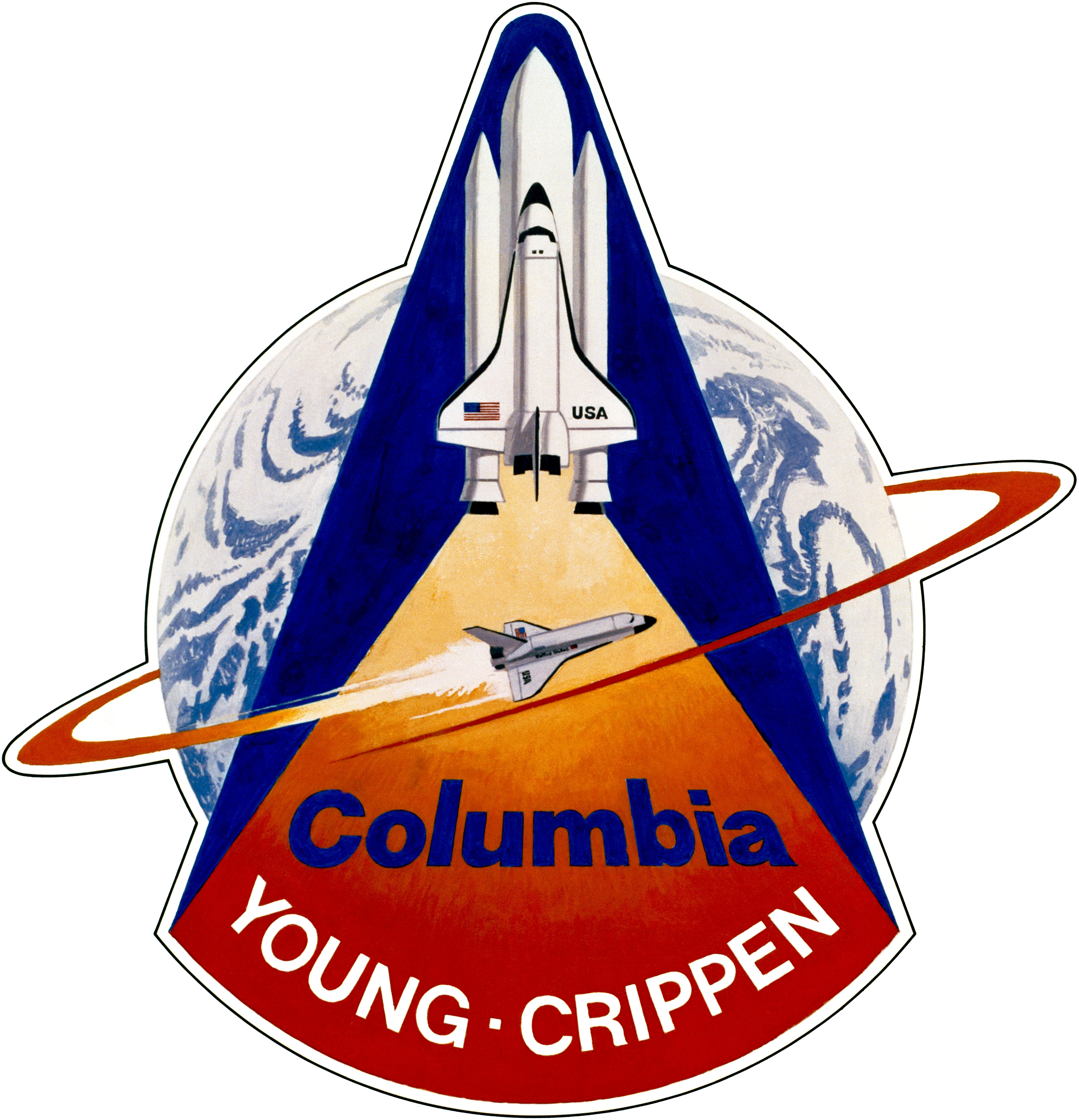
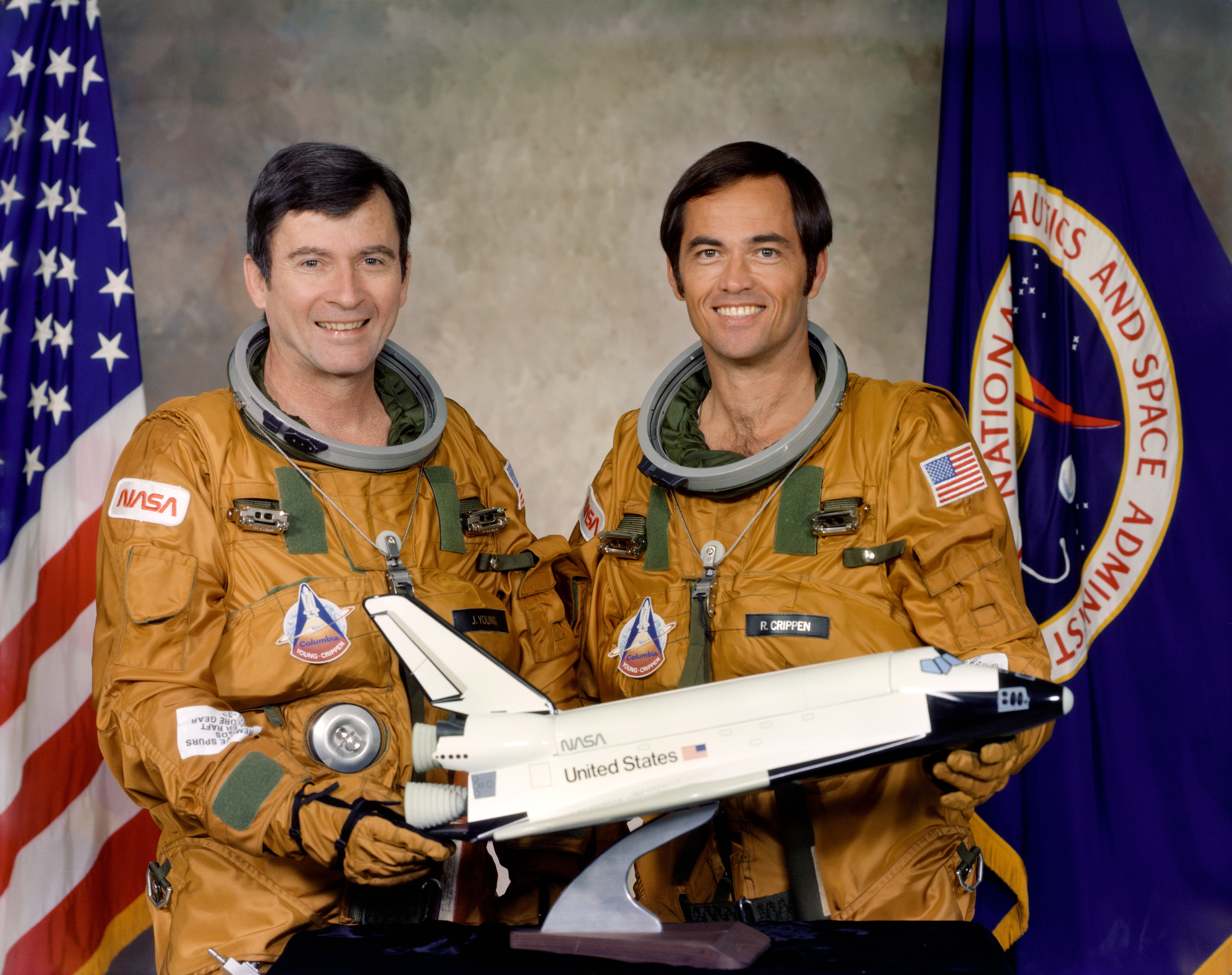
- STS-1 mission patch Young and Crippen Space Shuttle program

STS-1 (Space Transportation System-1) was the first orbital spaceflight of NASA's Space Shuttle program. The first orbiter, Columbia, launched on April 12, 1981, and returned on April 14, 1981, 54.5 hours later, having orbited the Earth 37 times. Columbia carried a crew of two—commander John W. Young and pilot Robert L. Crippen. It was the first American crewed space flight since the Apollo–Soyuz Test Project (ASTP) in 1975. STS-1 was also the maiden test flight of a new American spacecraft to carry a crew, though it was preceded by atmospheric testing (ALT) of the orbiter and ground testing of the Space Shuttle system.

The launch occurred on the 20th anniversary of Vostok 1, the first human spaceflight, performed by Yuri Gagarin for the USSR. This was a coincidence rather than a celebration of the anniversary; a technical problem had prevented STS-1 from launching two days earlier, as was planned.

== Crew ==
Position	Astronaut
Commander	John Young; Fifth spaceflight
Pilot	Robert Crippen; First spaceflight

Commander John Young and pilot Robert Crippen were selected as the STS-1 crew in early 1978. Young stated that as the Chief of the Astronaut Office he recommended himself to command the mission. Young, with four previous missions, was the most experienced astronaut in NASA at the time and was also the only member of NASA Astronaut Group 2 still in service. He flew twice on Project Gemini and twice on the Apollo program, walked on the Moon in 1972 as the Commander of Apollo 16, and became Chief of the Astronaut Office in 1974. Crippen, part of NASA Astronaut Group 7 after the cancellation of the Manned Orbiting Laboratory (MOL), was a rookie and would become the first of his astronaut group to fly in space. Prior to his selection on STS-1, Crippen participated in the Skylab Medical Experiment Altitude Test (SMEAT) and also served as a capsule communicator (capcom) for all three Skylab missions and the Apollo-Soyuz Test Project (ASTP).

Columbia carried Extravehicular Mobility Units (EMU) for both Young and Crippen in the event of an emergency spacewalk. If such an event occurred, Crippen would go outside the orbiter, with Young standing by in case Crippen required assistance.

As of April 1981 Young and Crippen trained the longest for a space mission before flying in NASA history. If STS-1 had launched in March 1979 as originally scheduled "We'd have been launched about halftrained", Young said. As no one had flown the shuttle before, they helped design the craft's controls, including 2,214 switches and displays in the cockpit—about three times as many on the Apollo command module—and many contingency procedures. STS-1 carried 22 manuals, each three inches thick and together weighing 29 kg (64 lb); the procedure for an electronics failure from a cooling system malfunction had 255 steps.

=== Backup crew ===
Position	Astronaut
Commander	Joe H. Engle
Pilot	Richard H. Truly
This crew flew on STS-2.

=== Support crew ===
- Daniel C. Brandenstein (ascent CAPCOM)
- Henry W. Hartsfield
- Joseph P. Allen (entry CAPCOM)

== Mission parameters ==
- Mass:
  - Orbiter liftoff: 99,453 kg (219,256 lb)
  - Orbiter landing: 88,662 kg (195,466 lb)
  - DFI payload: 4,909 kg (10,822 lb)
- Perigee: 246 km (153 mi)
- Apogee: 274 km (170 mi)
- Inclination: 40.30°
- Period: 89.88 minutes

=== Crew seat assignments ===
Seat	Launch	Landing	Seats 1–4 are on the flight deck. Seats 5–7 are on the mid-deck.
1	Young		Seats 1–4 are on the flight deck. Seats 5–7 are on the mid-deck.
2	Crippen		Seats 1–4 are on the flight deck. Seats 5–7 are on the mid-deck.
3	Unused		Seats 1–4 are on the flight deck. Seats 5–7 are on the mid-deck.
4	Unused		Seats 1–4 are on the flight deck. Seats 5–7 are on the mid-deck.
5	Unused		Seats 1–4 are on the flight deck. Seats 5–7 are on the mid-deck.
6	Unused		Seats 1–4 are on the flight deck. Seats 5–7 are on the mid-deck.
7	Unused		Seats 1–4 are on the flight deck. Seats 5–7 are on the mid-deck.

== Suborbital mission plan ==
During the original planning stages for the early Space Shuttle missions, NASA management under the Carter Administration felt a need to undertake initial tests of the system prior to the first orbital flight. To that end, Vice President Walter F. Mondale as chairman of the National Space Council suggested a suborbital flight landing at the emergency landing site at Dakar, Senegal. NASA further suggested that STS-1, instead of being an orbital flight, be used to test the Return To Launch Site (RTLS) abort scenario. This involved an abort being called in the first few moments after launch, and using its main engines, once the SRBs had been jettisoned, to power it back to the launch site. This scenario, while potentially necessary in the event of an early abort being called, was seen as being extremely dangerous. Young overruled both proposals, and STS-1 went ahead as the first orbital mission. The NASA managers were swayed by Young questioning the need for the test, and the weight of his opinion was especially strong as he was someone who not only had been to the Moon twice, but had walked on it. He would fly the Space Shuttle again on the STS-9 mission, a ten-day flight in 1983.

Let's not practice Russian roulette, because you may have a loaded gun there.

— John W. Young on testing the Return To Launch Site Abort.

== Mission summary ==
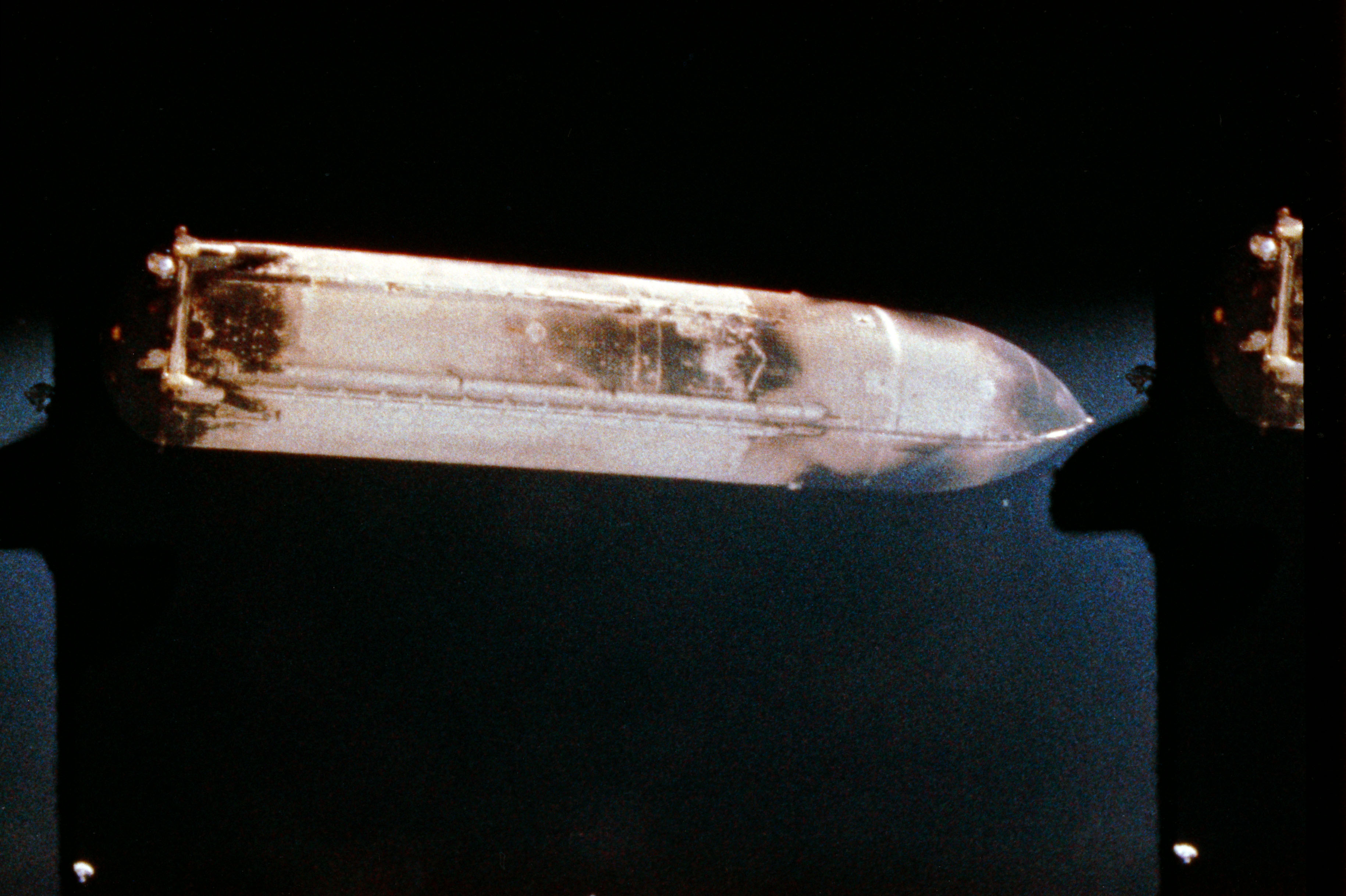
The external tank is released from the Space Shuttle orbiter.

The first launch of the Space Shuttle occurred on April 12, 1981, exactly 20 years after Vostok 1 (the first crewed space flight), when the Columbia orbiter lifted off from Pad A, Launch Complex 39, at the Kennedy Space Center. The launch took place at 12:00:04 UTC. A launch attempt two days earlier was scrubbed because Columbia's four primary general purpose IBM System/4 Pi computers (GPCs) failed to provide correct timing to the backup flight system (BFS) when the GPCs were scheduled to transition from vehicle checkout to flight configuration mode.

Attempt	Planned	Result	Turnaround	Reason	Decision point	Notes
1	10 Apr 1981, 7:00:00 am	Scrubbed	−	Technical	(T−18 minutes)	Timing problem in one of Columbia's general purpose IBM System/4 Pi computers. A software patch was installed to correct.
2	12 Apr 1981 7:00:04	Success	2 days 0 hours 0 minutes			

Not only was this the first launch of the Space Shuttle, but it marked the first time that solid-fuel rockets were used for a NASA crewed launch (although previous systems had used solid-fuel motors for their escape towers or retro rockets). STS-1 was also the first U.S. crewed space vehicle launched without an uncrewed powered test flight. The STS-1 orbiter, Columbia, holds the record for the longest amount of time spent in the Orbiter Processing Facility (OPF) before launch – 610 days, the time needed for the replacement of many of its heat shield tiles.

The NASA mission objective for the maiden flight was to accomplish a safe ascent into orbit and return to Earth for a safe landing of Orbiter and crew. The only payload carried on the mission was a Development Flight Instrumentation (DFI) package, which contained sensors and measuring devices to record the orbiter's performance and the stresses that occurred during launch, ascent, orbital flight, descent and landing. All 113 flight test objectives were accomplished, and the orbiter's spaceworthiness was verified.

During the final T−9 minute holding period, Launch Director George Page read a message of good wishes to the crew from President Ronald Reagan, ending with, "John, we can't do more from the launch team than say, we wish you an awful lot of luck. We are with you one thousand percent and we are awful proud to have been a part of it. Good luck gentlemen."

Ignition of the three RS-25 main engines was sensed as a sharp increase in noise. The stack rocked "downwards" (towards the crew's feet), then back up to the vertical, at which point both Solid Rocket Boosters (SRBs) ignited. Crippen likened lift-off to a "steam catapult shot" (such as when an aircraft is launched from an aircraft carrier). The stack's combined northwards translation and climb above the launch tower's lightning rod were readily apparent to Young. After clearing the tower the stack began a right roll (until the +Z axis or vertical fin pointed) to a launch azimuth of 067° True (in order to achieve an orbital inclination of 40.30°), and pitched to a "heads down" attitude (to reduce loading on the wings). Simultaneously, control was passed from the launch team in Florida to Flight Director Neil Hutchinson's Silver team in Flight Control Room 1 (FCR 1) in Texas with astronaut Dan Brandenstein as their CAPCOM.

Columbia's main engines were throttled down to 65% thrust to transit the region of Max Q, the point during ascent when the shuttle undergoes maximum aerodynamic stress. This occurred 56 seconds into the flight at Mach 1.06. The wind corrected value was 29 kPa (4.2 psi) (predicted 28 kPa (4.1 psi), limit 30 kPa (4.4 psi)). The two SRBs performed better than expected, causing a lofted trajectory, and were jettisoned after burnout at 2 minutes and 12 seconds (at 53,000 m (174,000 ft) altitude, 2,800 m (9,200 ft) higher than planned). After 8 minutes and 34 seconds Mission Elapsed Time (MET), the main engines were shut down (MECO, at altitude 118,000 m (387,000 ft)) and the external tank was jettisoned 18 seconds later to eventually break up in the atmosphere and impact the Indian Ocean. Two twin-engined Orbital Maneuvering System (OMS) engine burns lasting 86 seconds initiated at 10 minutes and 34 seconds MET and 75 seconds duration at 44 minutes 2 seconds MET inserted Columbia into a 246 × 248 km (153 × 154 mi) orbit. This subtle deviation from the original plan of 240 km (150 mi) circular went largely unnoticed. In fact, it adjusted the spacecraft's orbital period to take account of the April 10, 1981, scrub, so that attempts could still be made to use KH-11 reconnaissance satellites to image Columbia on orbit. Young commented that there was a lot less vibration and noise during launch than they had expected. However, the sensations accompanying the first firing of the large Reaction Control System (RCS) jets surprised the crew. Crippen commented "it's like a big cannon just fired ... you don't like them the first time you hear them". Young reported that "the entire cabin vibrates ... it felt like the nose was being bent".

Once in orbit, both crew members safed their ejection seats and unstrapped. The next critical event was payload bay door opening. This was essential to allow heat rejection from Columbia's systems via the doors' space radiators. Failure to open these by the end of the second orbit would have resulted in a return to Earth at the end of the fifth orbit, before the limited capacity of the flash evaporator cooling system was exceeded. As they opened the doors the crew noticed that they had sustained damage to thermal protection system (TPS) tiles on the OMS pods. This was televised to the ground. Shortly afterwards Young, then Crippen doffed their emergency ejection suits.

The majority of the crew's approximately 53 hours in low Earth orbit was spent conducting systems tests. Despite the scheduling impact of efforts to image Columbia's TPS by utilizing external assets, these were all accomplished. They included: Crew Optical Alignment Sight (COAS) calibration, star tracker performance, Inertial Measurement Unit (IMU) performance, manual and automatic RCS testing, radiation measurement, propellant crossfeeding, hydraulics functioning, fuel cell purging, and photography. The OMS-3 and OMS-4 burns at 006:20:46 and 007:05:32 MET respectively raised this orbit to 273.9 × 274.1 km (170.2 × 170.3 mi) (compared to a planned 280 km (174 mi) circular). These two firings were single engined utilizing the crossfeed system. The crew reported a cold first night on board despite acceptable temperature indications. They found the second night comfortable after settings were adjusted.

During the second day of the mission, the astronauts received a phone call from Vice President George H. W. Bush. President Ronald Reagan had originally intended to visit the Mission Control Center during the mission, but at the time was still recovering from an assassination attempt which had taken place two weeks before the launch (Reagan had returned home to the White House only the day prior to the launch).

The crew awoke from their second sleep period earlier than planned. Preparations for return to Earth began with breakfast. Stowing of cabin items, flight control system checkout, data processing system reconfigurations, and then ejection suit donning followed. In Houston, the Crimson team headed by their Flight Director Don Puddy came on duty in FCR 1 for the mission's final shift. His CAPCOM was astronaut Joseph P. Allen with Frederick Hauck assisting. Payload bay door closing was a critical milestone to ensure vehicle structural and thermal integrity for re-entry. If power closing had failed, Crippen was trained to conduct a one-man extravehicular activity (EVA) to manually winch them closed. With cabin switch positions verified, the crew strapped into their ejection seats. Meanwhile, Johnson Space Center (JSC) pilots Charlie Hayes and Ted Mendenhall were airborne over California's Edwards Air Force Base area in a Shuttle Training Aircraft (STA) performing a final check of landing weather conditions.

Auxiliary Power Units (APUs) 2 and 3 were started (to provide flight control hydraulic pressure). The 160-second twin-engine OMS de-orbit burn took place during the 36th orbit over the southern Indian Ocean and changed the orbital parameters from 270 × 274 km (168 × 170 mi) to 270 × 0 km (168 × 0 mi). This ensured atmospheric capture of the spacecraft close enough to the planned landing site to have sufficient energy for a controlled glide landing, but not so close that energy would have to be dissipated at a rate exceeding its structural capability. Young then slowly pitched Columbia up to the wings level nose high entry attitude. Both crew members armed their ejection seats during this pitch around. Nearly half an hour later APU 1 was started as planned. Shortly afterwards, Columbia entered an approximately 21-minute long communications blackout. This was due to a combination of ionization (16 minutes) and lack of ground station coverage between Guam and Buckhorn Tracking Station at Dryden Flight Research Facility. Entry Interface (EI) was reached over the eastern Pacific Ocean 8,110 km (5,040 mi) from the landing site at a speed of around 28,240 km/h (17,550 mph). EI is merely an arbitrarily defined geodetic altitude of 120,000 m (390,000 ft) employed by NASA for the purposes of trajectory computations and mission planning. Above this altitude, the spacecraft is considered to be outside the "sensable atmosphere".

Most of this first orbiter entry was flown automatically. An initial angle of attack of 40° had to be maintained until through the most severe aerodynamic heating after which it was gradually reduced. At about 100,000 m (330,000 ft) altitude a light pink air glow caused by entry heating became visible, and both crew members lowered their visors. Columbia had to maneuver 583 km (362 mi) "cross range" of its orbital ground track to reach the planned landing site during the entry. Consequently, a roll into a right bank was flown when the air density had increased sufficiently to raise dynamic pressure to 570 Pa (0.083 psi) (with speed still in excess of Mach 24 and approximately 78,000 m (256,000 ft) altitude). Automatic roll reversals to control energy dissipation rate and cross range steering were performed at around Mach 18.5 and Mach 9.8. The crew clearly observed the coast of California as Columbia crossed it near Big Sur at Mach 7 and 41,000 m (135,000 ft). Both the Mach 4.8 and Mach 2.8 roll reversals were automatically initiated and manually completed by John Young. The last RCS jet firing took place at an altitude of 17,000 m (56,000 ft) — 4,300 m (14,100 ft) lower than desired (due to a predicted risk of combustion chamber explosion).

Young again took manual control for the remainder of the flight as they went subsonic approaching the Heading Alignment Circle (HAC). A wide left turn was flown to line up with lake bed runway 23, whilst T-38 "Chase 1", crewed by astronauts Jon McBride and "Pinky" Nelson joined formation. Main gear touch down occurred on runway 23 at Edwards Air Force Base, at 339 km/h (211 mph) equivalent airspeed, slightly slower and around 800 m (2,600 ft) further down the runway than planned. This was the result of a combination of better than predicted Orbiter lift-to-drag ratios and tail wind. Touch down time was 18:21 UTC on April 14, 1981. As they rolled to a stop, Young remarked over the radio, "This is the world's greatest all electric flying machine. I'll tell you that. That was super!"

Columbia was returned to Kennedy Space Center from California on April 28, 1981, atop the Shuttle Carrier Aircraft. The 36-orbit, 1,729,348 km (1,074,567 mi) flight lasted 2 days, 6 hours, 20 minutes and 53 seconds.

=== Mission anomalies ===
STS-1 touches down at Edwards Air Force Base.

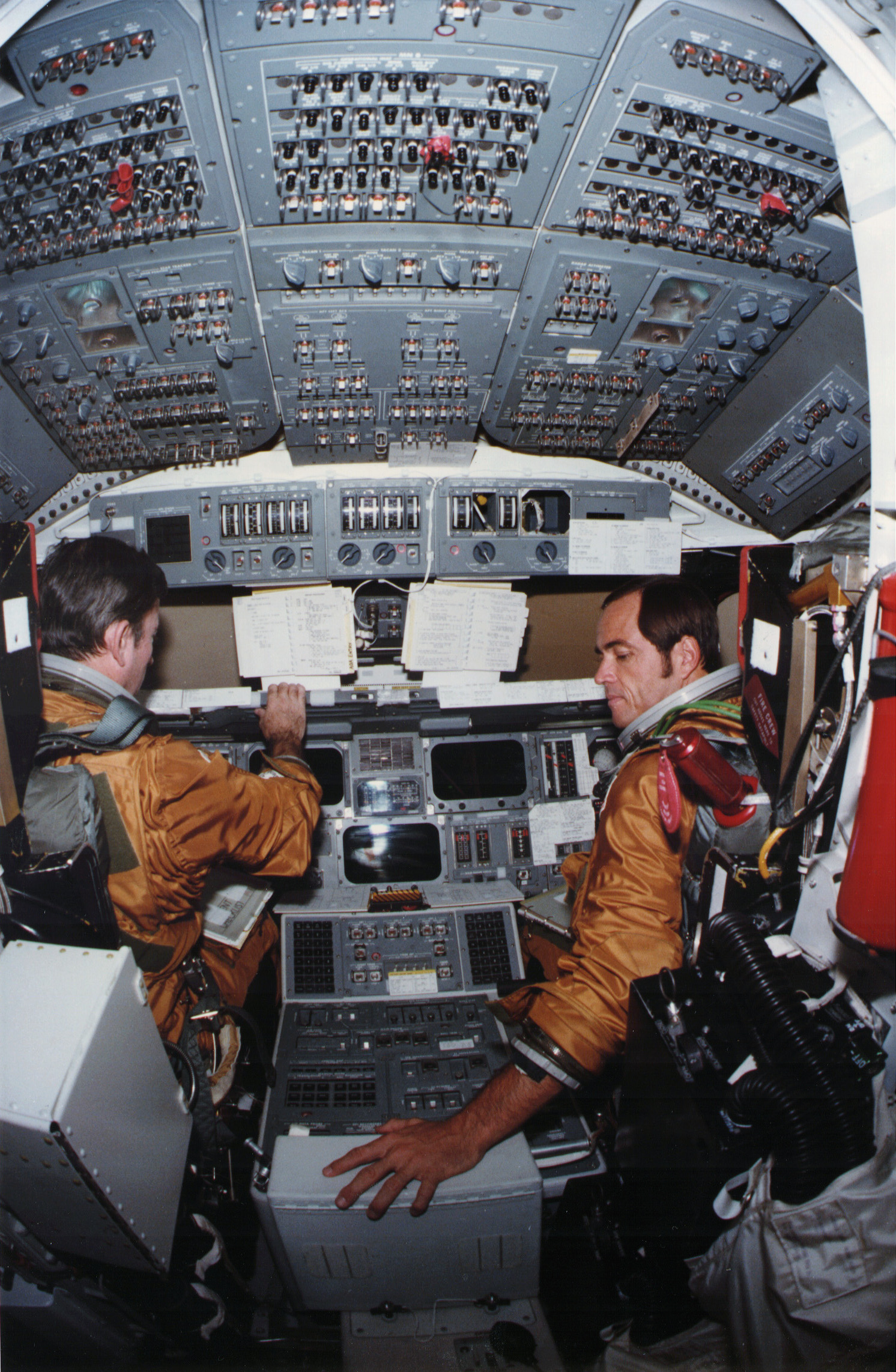
STS-1 crew in Space Shuttle Columbia's cabin. This is a view of training in 1980 in the Orbiter Processing Facility.

STS-1 was the first orbital test flight of what NASA claims was, at the time, the most complex flying machine ever built. Roughly 70 anomalies were observed during and after the flight, owing to the many components and systems that could not otherwise be adequately tested. These included:

- Similar to the first Saturn V launch in 1967, engineers underestimated the amount of noise and vibration produced by the Space Shuttle. Shock waves from the SRB thrust were deflected up into the orbiter's tail section, which flexed the wing flaps and bent several fuel tank supports; Columbia could have had trouble landing if the flaps had been damaged. An improved sound suppression system was later installed in LC-39A to damp vibrations.
- Pilot Crippen reported that, throughout the first stage of the launch up to SRB separation, he saw "white stuff" coming off the External Tank and splattering the windows, which was probably the white paint covering the External Tank's thermal foam.
- The astronauts' on-orbit visual inspection showed significant damage to the thermal protection tiles on the OMS/RCS pods at the orbiter's aft end, and John Young reported that two tiles on the nose looked like someone had taken "big bites out of them". The U.S. Air Force also photographed the orbiter's tiles using a secret KH-11 KENNEN reconnaissance satellite controlled by Blue Cube. Only the prime and backup crews and a few other NASA employees were aware of this. Young and Crippen were instructed to perform maneuvers to align Columbia so that the KH-11 could photograph it; because of the preplanned required trajectory, the launch window was far narrower than the publicized six hours. Images obtained confirmed that damage to Columbia was not serious. Post-flight inspection of Columbia confirmed that approximately 16 undensified tiles near the OMS pod had been lost during ascent.
- Columbia's aerodynamics at high Mach numbers during reentry were found to differ significantly in some respects from those estimated in pre-flight testing. A misprediction of the location of the center of pressure (due to using an ideal gas model instead of a real gas model) caused the computer to have to extend the body flap by sixteen degrees rather than the expected eight or nine. The first roll maneuver resulted in lateral and directional oscillations during which side slip angles of up to 4° were reached, twice as high as predicted. Analysis attributed the cause to unexpectedly large rolling moments due to yaw RCS jet firings. During the early stages of entry, orbiter roll control is achieved as a result of sideslip modulation.
- The orbiter's heat shield was damaged when an overpressure wave from the solid rocket booster caused a forward RCS oxidizer strut to fail.
- The same overpressure wave also forced the orbiter body flap – an extension on the orbiter's underbelly that helps to control pitch during reentry – into an angle well beyond the point where cracking or rupture of its hydraulic system would have been expected. Such damage would have made a controlled descent impossible, with John Young later admitting that had the crew known about this, they would have flown the shuttle up to a safe altitude and ejected, causing Columbia to be lost on the first flight. Young had reservations about ejection as a safe abort mode due to the fact that the SRBs were firing throughout the ejection window, but he justified taking this risk because, in his view, an inoperative body flap would have made landing and descent "extremely difficult if not impossible".
- The strike plate next to the forward latch of Columbia's external-tank door was melted and distorted due to excess heat exposure during reentry. This heat was attributed to an improperly installed tile adjacent to the plate.
- During remarks at a 2003 gathering, John Young stated that a protruding tile gap filler ducted hot gas into the right main landing gear well, which caused significant damage, including the buckling of the landing gear door. He said that neither he nor Crippen were told about this incident and he was not aware that it had happened until reading the postflight mission report for STS-1, also adding that the gas leak was noted in the report, but not the buckling of the landing door. (The buckling of the door is in fact in the anomaly report, anomaly STS-1-V-49).

Despite these problems, the STS-1 mission was completed successfully, and in most respects Columbia performed optimally. After some modifications to the Shuttle and to the launch and reentry procedures, Columbia flew the next four Shuttle missions.

== Mission insignia ==
The artwork for the official mission insignia was designed by artist Robert McCall. It is a symbolic representation of the Space Shuttle. The image does not depict the black wing roots present on the actual Shuttle.

== Anniversary ==
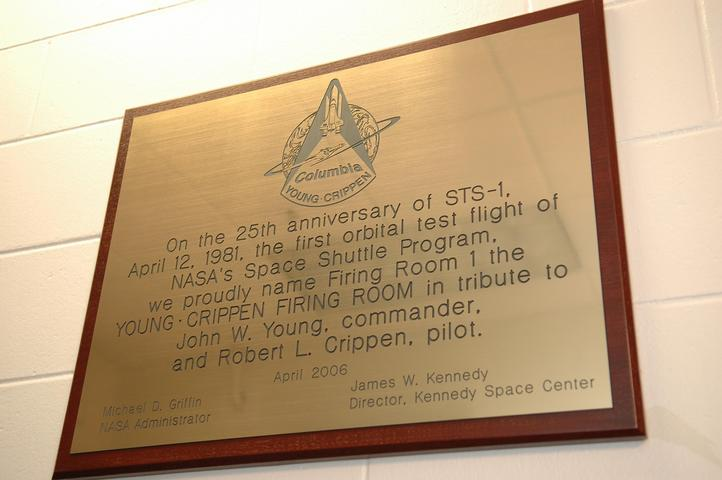
The plaque of the Young-Crippen Firing Room in the Launch Control Center at Kennedy Space Center.

The ultimate launch date of STS-1 fell on the 20th anniversary of Yuri Gagarin's Vostok 1, the first spaceflight to carry a human crew. In 2001, Yuri's Night was established to celebrate both events. In a tribute to the 25th anniversary of the first flight of Space Shuttle, Firing Room 1 in the Launch Control Center at Kennedy Space Center – which launched STS-1 – was renamed the Young-Crippen Firing Room. NASA described the mission as "the boldest test flight in history".

== External tank ==
STS-1 and STS-2 were the only two shuttle flights to have the External Tank painted white. To reduce the Shuttle's overall weight, all flights from STS-3 onward used an unpainted tank. The use of an unpainted tank provided a weight saving of approximately 272 kg (600 lb), and gave the External Tank the distinctive orange color which later became associated with the Space Shuttle.

== In popular culture ==
The song "Countdown" by Rush, from the 1982 album Signals, was written about STS-1 and the inaugural flight of Columbia. The song was "dedicated with thanks to astronauts Young and Crippen and all the people of NASA for their inspiration and cooperation".

The footage of the launch was commonly played on MTV throughout the 1980s and 1990s, and was the first thing shown on the channel, along with footage of Neil Armstrong on the Moon and the launch of Apollo 11.

IMAX cameras filmed the launch, landing, and mission control during the flight, for a documentary film entitled Hail Columbia, which debuted in 1982 and later became available on DVD. The title of the film comes from the pre-1930s unofficial American national anthem, "Hail, Columbia".

The beginning of the song "Hello Earth", on Kate Bush's 1985 Hounds of Love album, contains a short clip of dialogue between Columbia and Mission Control, during the last few minutes of its descent, beginning with "Columbia now at nine times the speed of sound..."

In 2006, "Collateral Damage," the 12th episode of the ninth season of the long-running Canadian-American military science fiction television show Stargate SG-1, a childhood flashback shows that the character Lieutenant Colonel Cameron Mitchell witnessed the launch with his father live on television at the age of ten, one of the events that led to him becoming a United States Air Force pilot.

== Wake-up calls ==
NASA began a tradition of playing music to astronauts during the Project Gemini, and first used music to wake up a flight crew during Apollo 15. A special musical track is chosen for each day in space, often by the astronauts' families, to have a special meaning to an individual member of the crew, or in reference to the day's planned activities.

Flight day	Song	Artist/composer
Day 2	"Blast-Off Columbia"	Written by Jerry W. Rucker, a NASA shuttle technician; sung by Roy McCall
Day 3	"Reveille"	Houston DJs Hudson and Harrigan

== Pad fatalities ==
I think it is only right that we mention a couple of guys that gave their lives a few weeks ago in our countdown demonstration test: John Bjornstad and Forrest Cole. They believed in the space program, and it meant a lot to them. I am sure they would be thrilled to see where we have the vehicle now.

— STS-1 Pilot Robert Crippen, tribute given on-orbit to the victims of the accident.

An accident occurred on March 19, 1981, that led to the deaths of three people. During a countdown test for STS-1, a pure nitrogen atmosphere was introduced in the aft engine compartment of Space Shuttle Columbia to reduce the danger of an explosion from the many other potentially dangerous gases on board the orbiter. At the conclusion of the test, pad workers were given clearance to return to work on the orbiter, even though the nitrogen had not yet been purged due to a recent procedural change. Three technicians – John Bjornstad, Forrest Cole, and Nick Mullon – entered the compartment without air packs, unaware of the danger, since nitrogen gas is odorless and colorless, and lost consciousnesses due to lack of oxygen. Several minutes later, another worker saw them and tried to help, but passed out himself. The fourth did not alert anyone, but was himself seen by two other people. Of those two, one alerted a security guard and another went to help the unconscious group. The security guard entered the compartment with an air pack and removed the five men from the compartment.

Security procedures delayed ambulances from arriving on the scene by several minutes. Bjornstad died at the scene; Cole died on April 1 without ever regaining consciousness, and Mullon suffered permanent brain damage and died on April 11, 1995, from complications of his injuries. These were the first launchpad deaths at Cape Canaveral since the Apollo 1 fire, which killed three astronauts during preparations for the crewed Moon landing missions.

The incident did not delay the launch of STS-1 less than a month later, but pilot Robert Crippen gave an on-orbit tribute to Bjornstad and Cole. A three-month inquiry determined that a combination of a recent change in safety procedures and a miscommunication during the operations were the cause of the accident. A report called LC-39A Mishap Investigation Board Final Report was released with the findings. The names of John Bjornstad, Forrest Cole and Nicholas Mullon are engraved on a monument at the US Space Walk of Fame in Florida.

== Gallery ==
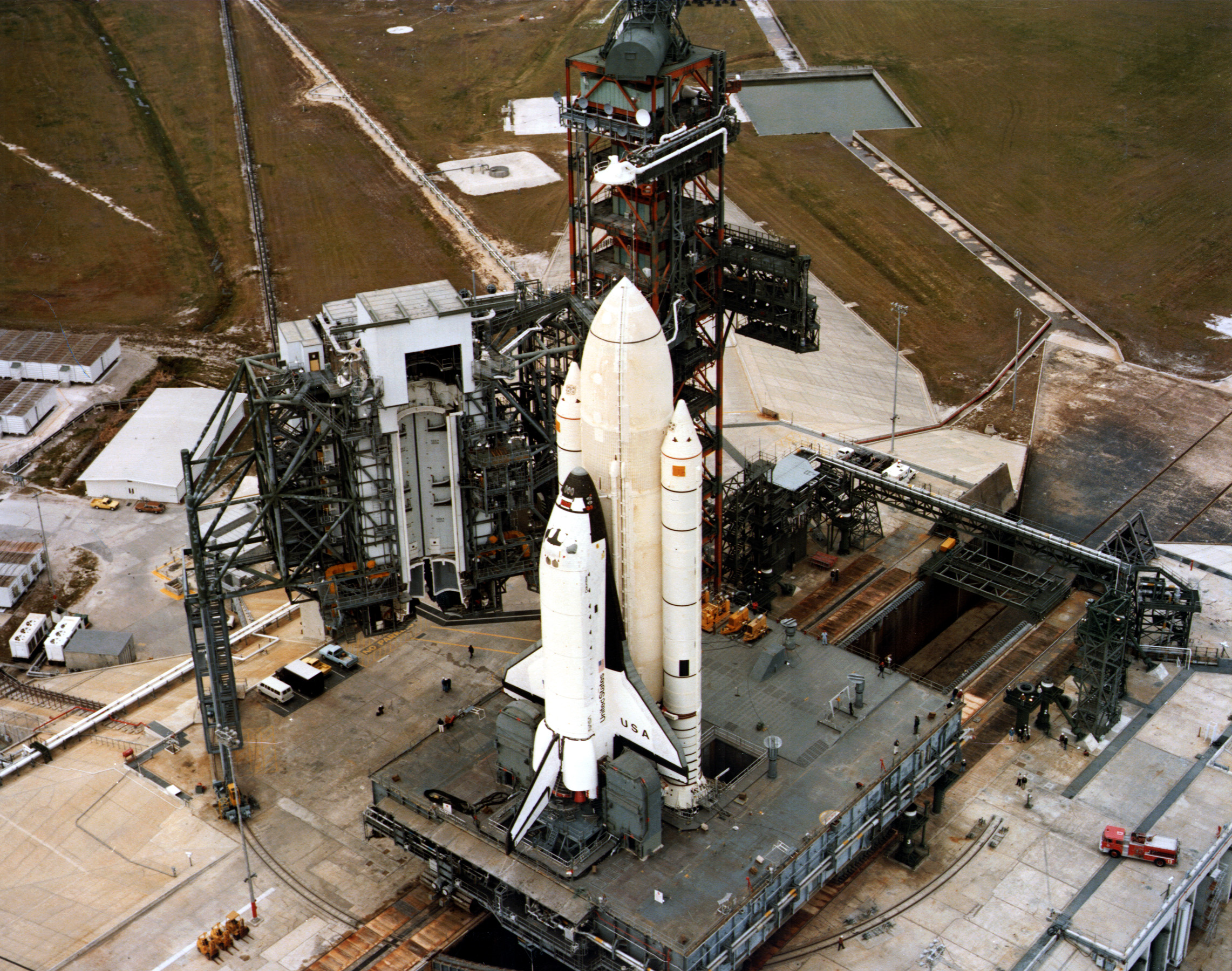
Columbia's arrival at Complex 39A, on 29 December 1980.

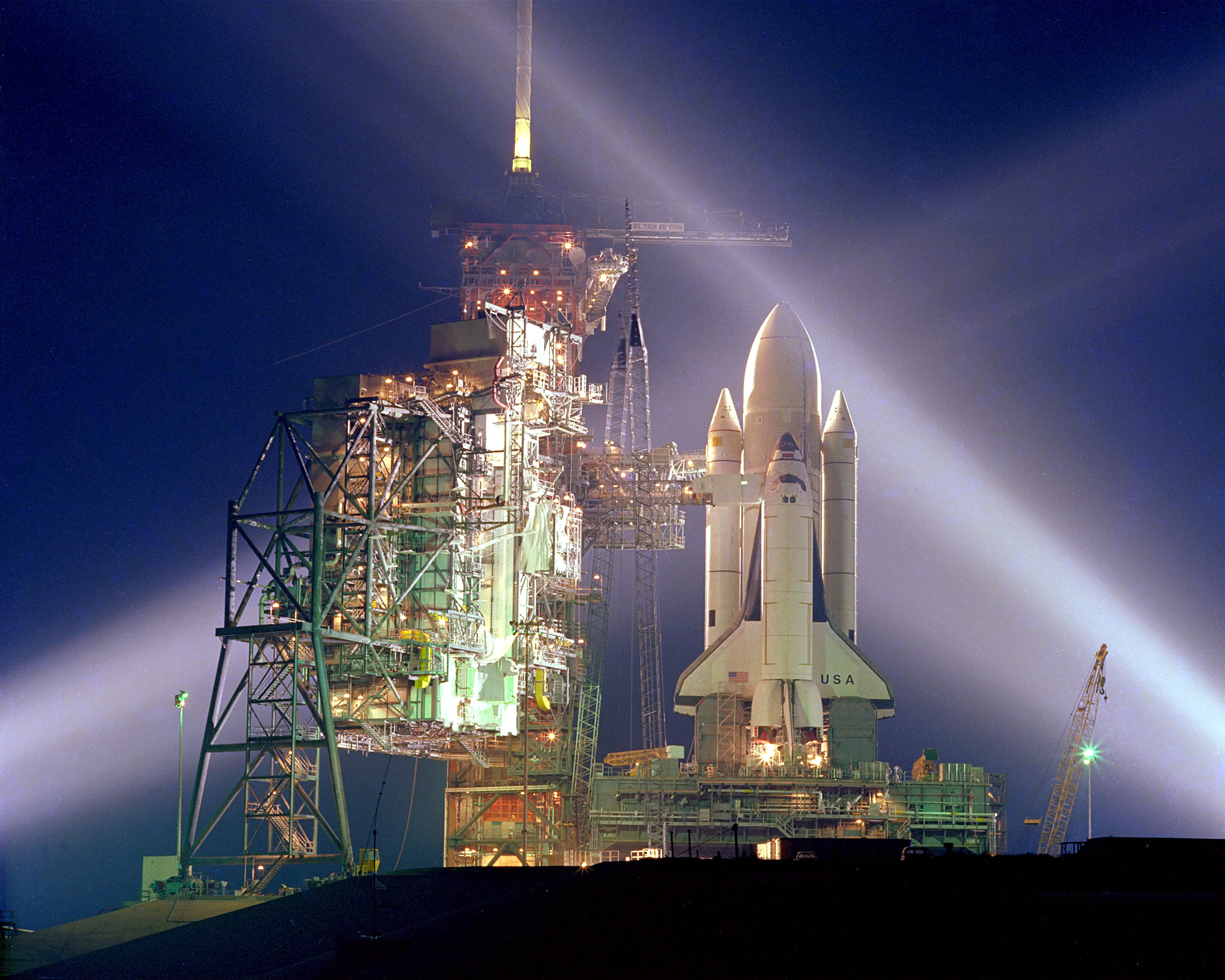
Columbia at Launch Complex 39A, on 5 March 1981.

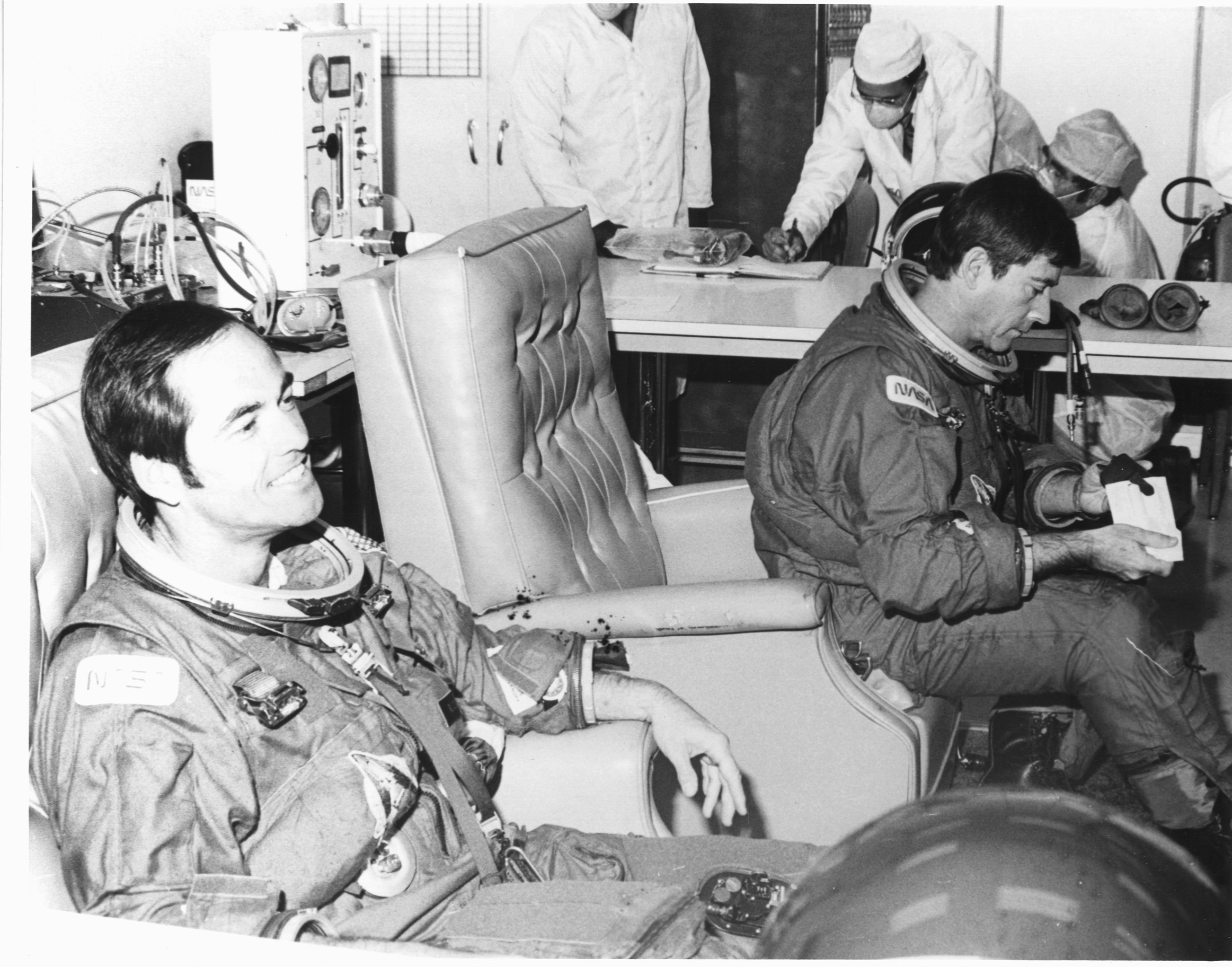
Commander John Young (right) and Pilot Robert Crippen (left) suit up for launch, on 12 April 1981.

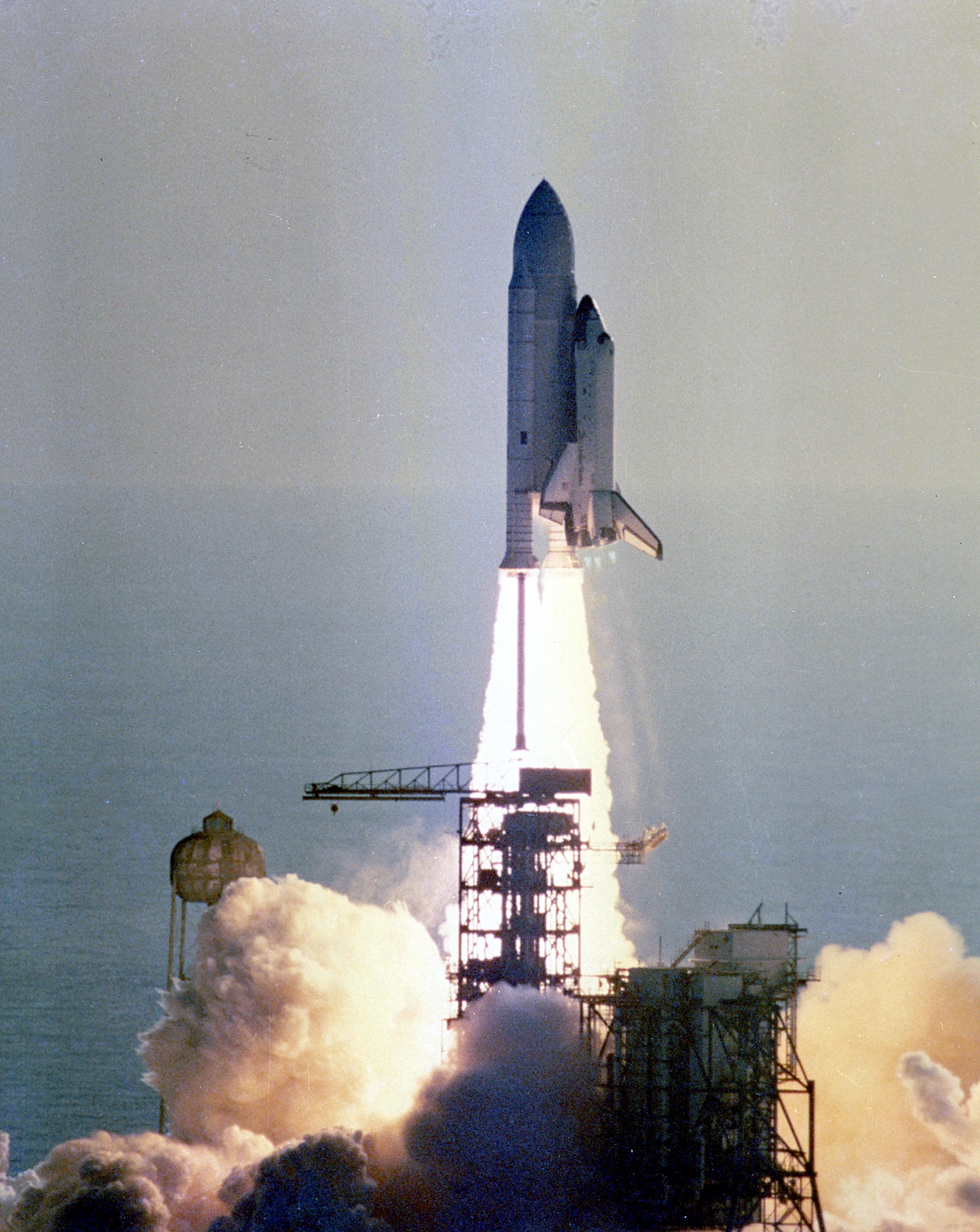
Columbia lifts off at the beginning of STS-1.

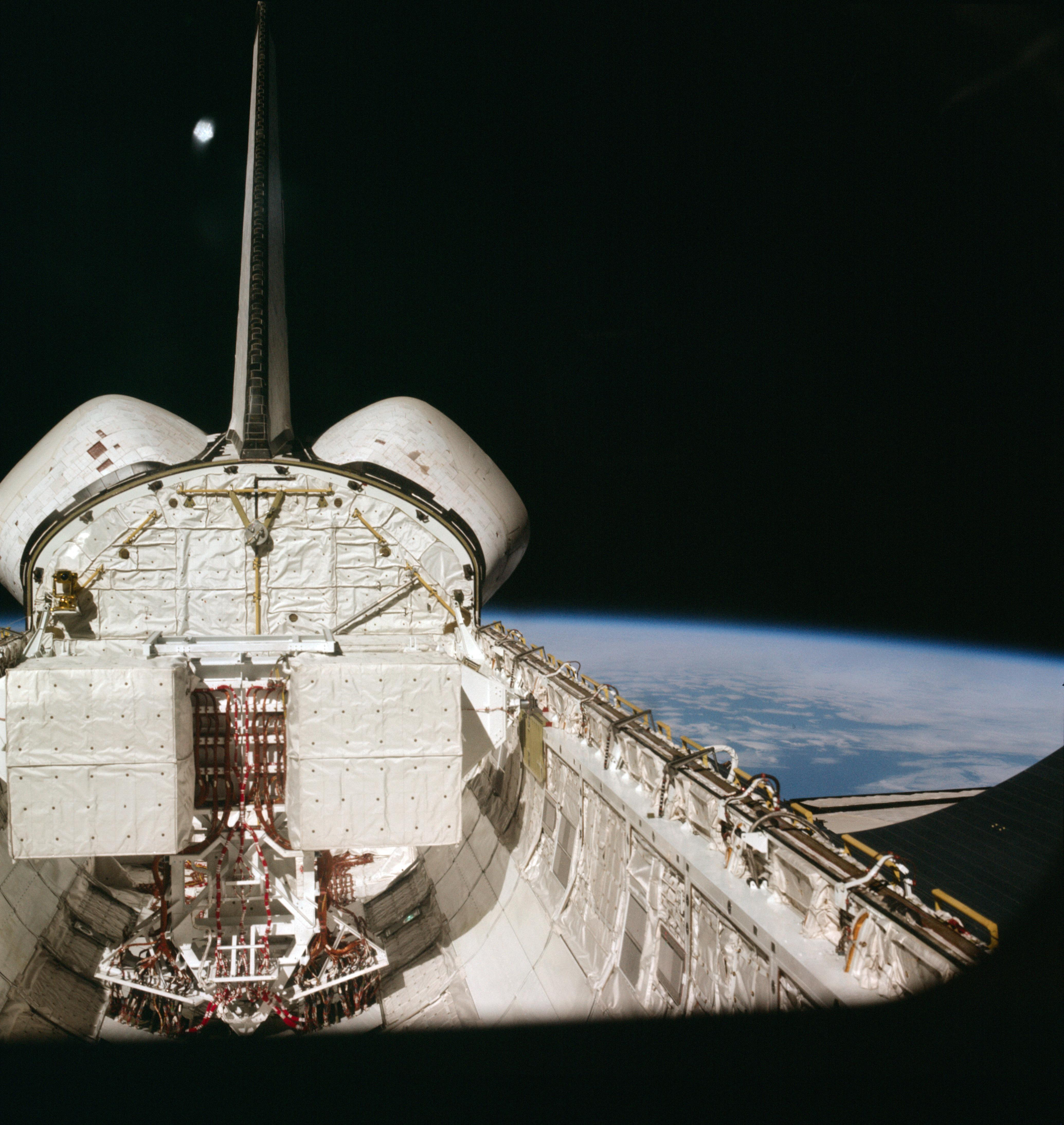
Columbia's cargo bay and aft section, on 12 April 1981.

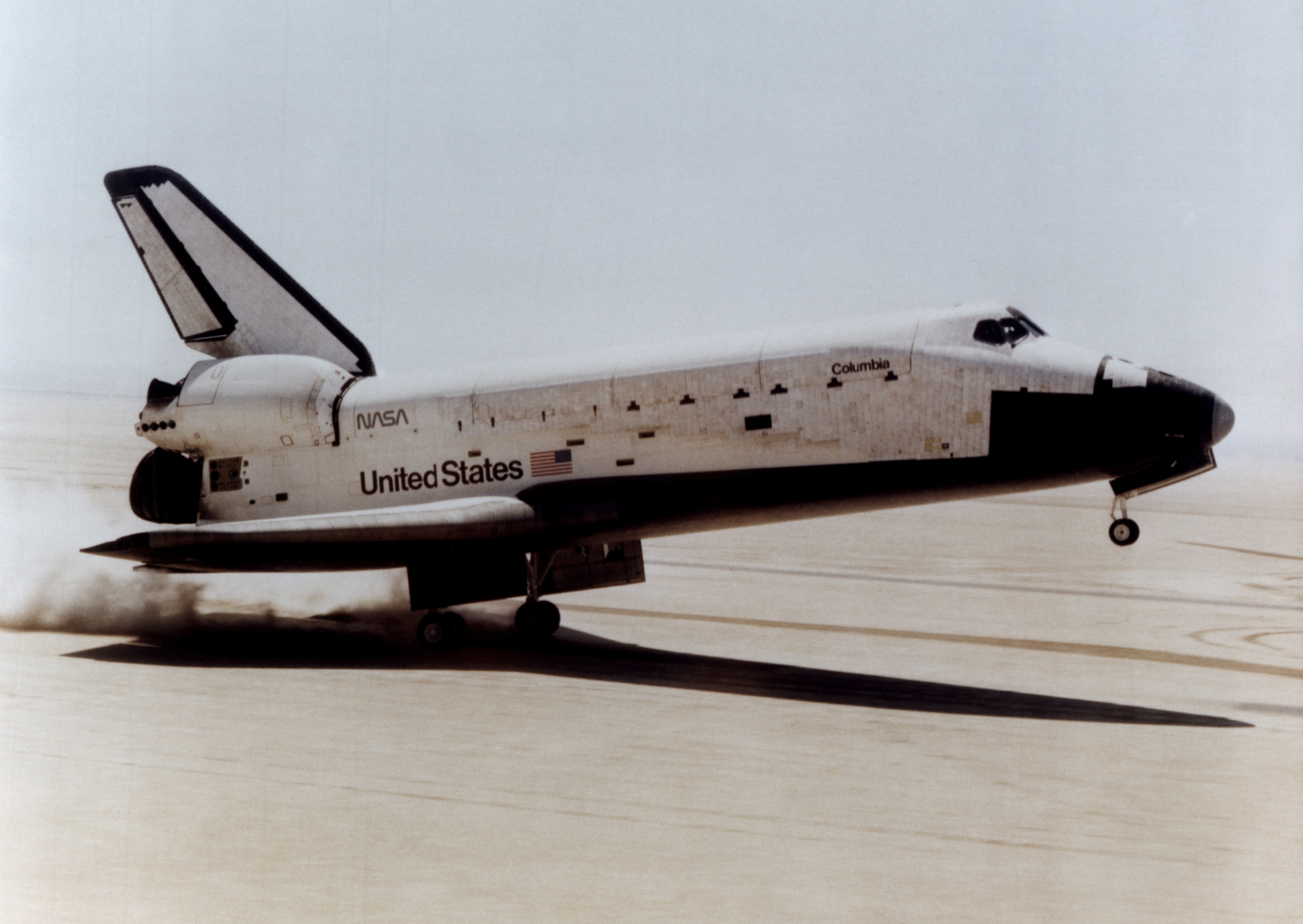
Columbia landing on Rogers Dry Lake bed at Edwards Air Force Base, on 14 April 1981.

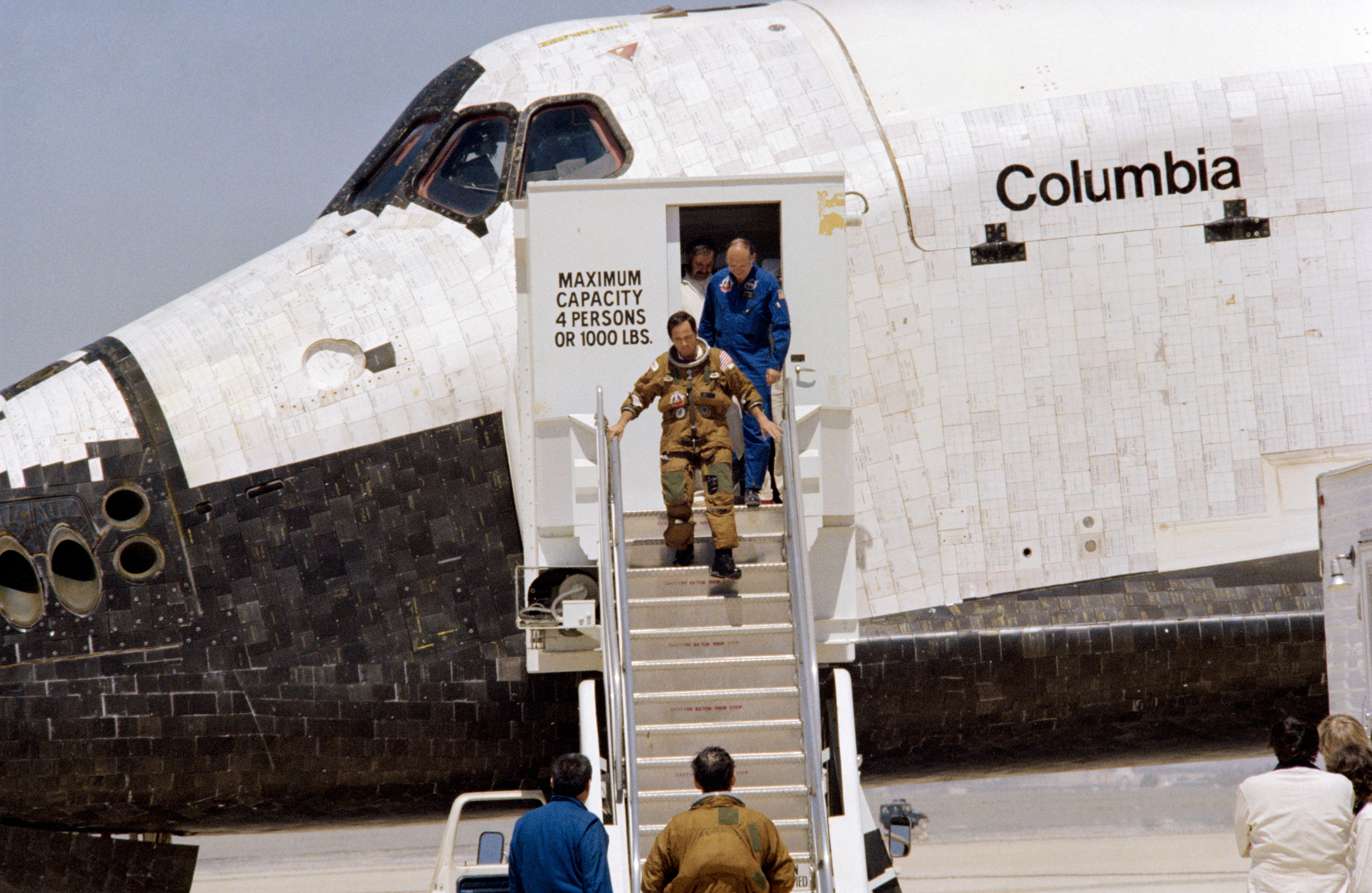
Columbia after its successful landing.

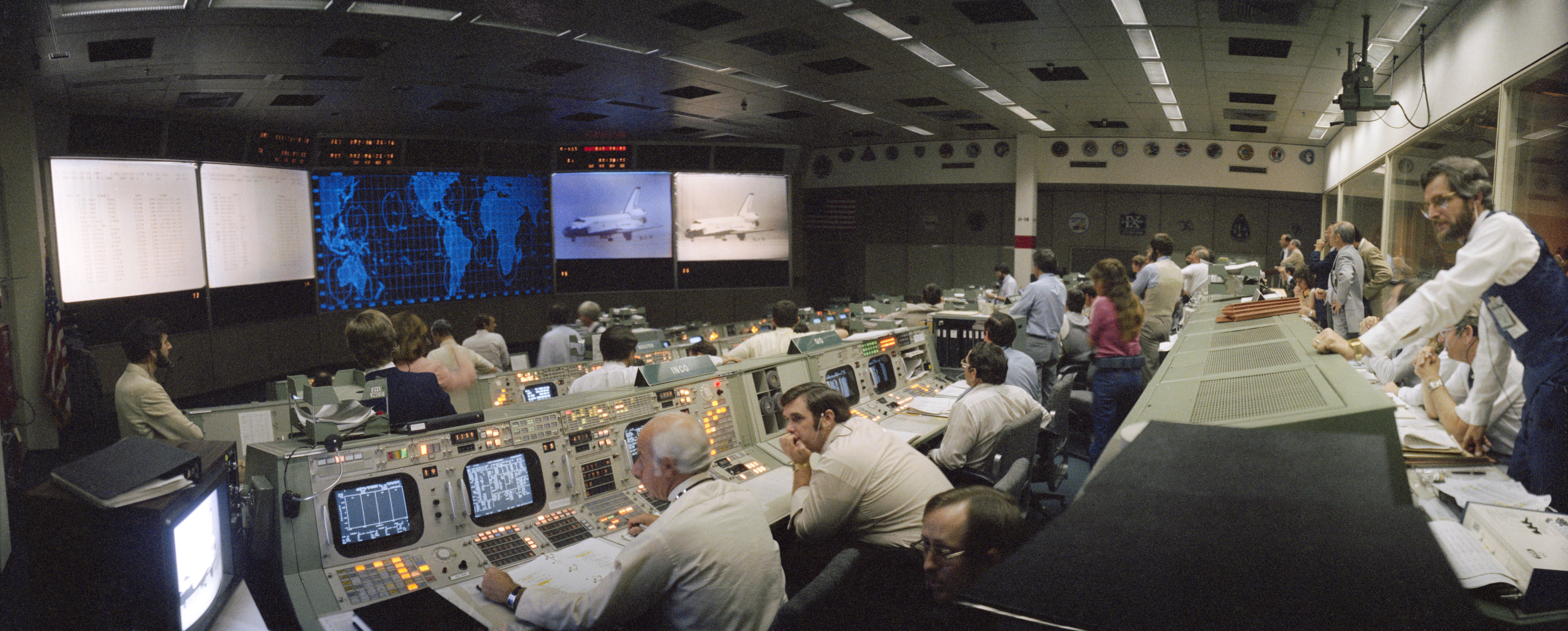
An overall view of the Mission Operations Control Room in Houston during Columbia's landing phase.

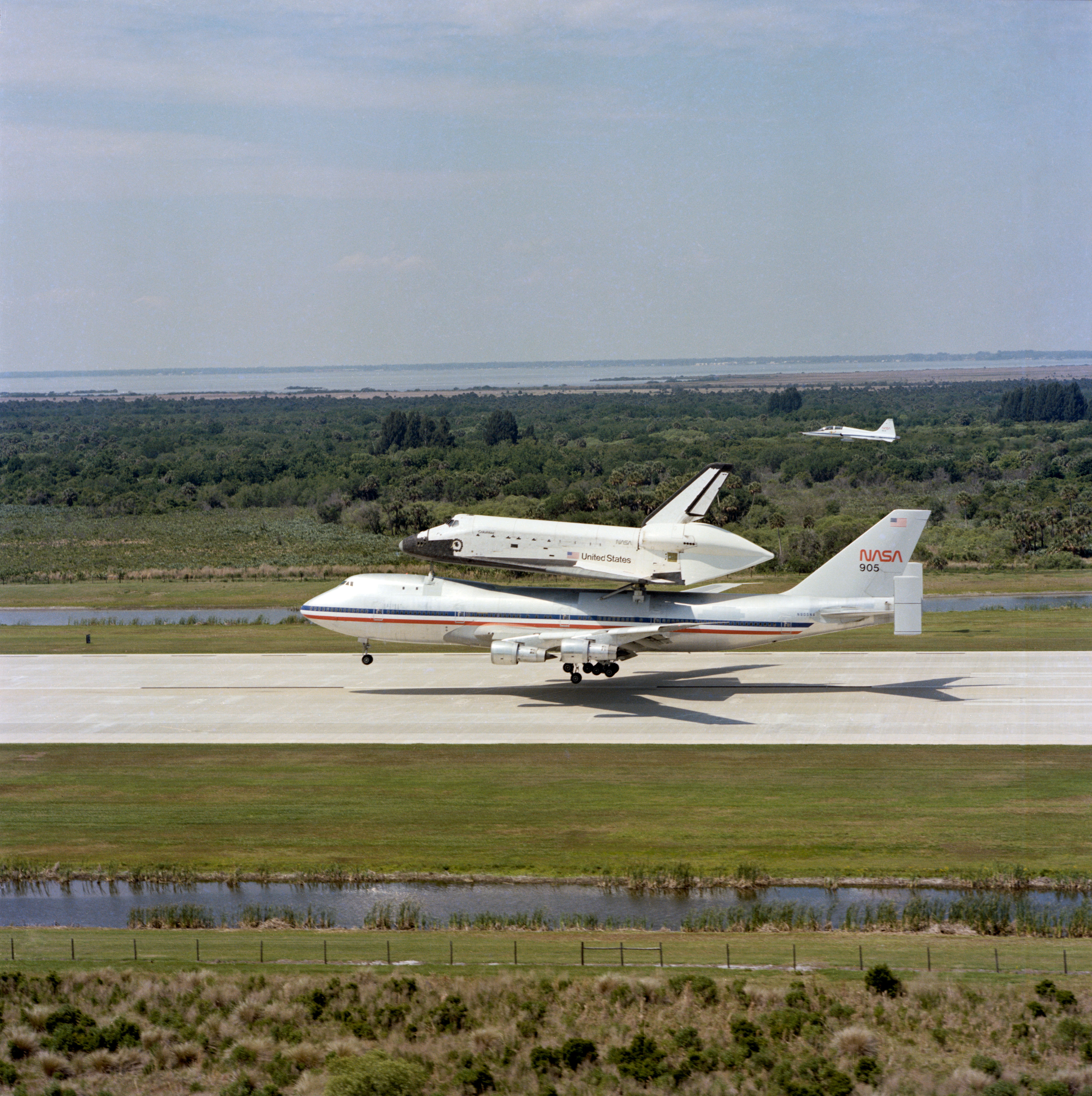
Columbia, mated to the Shuttle Carrier Aircraft, arrives at Kennedy Space Center after STS-1 to be prepared for its next mission.

== See also ==
- List of human spaceflights
- List of Space Shuttle missions
- Space Shuttle Columbia disaster
