= Don Puddy =

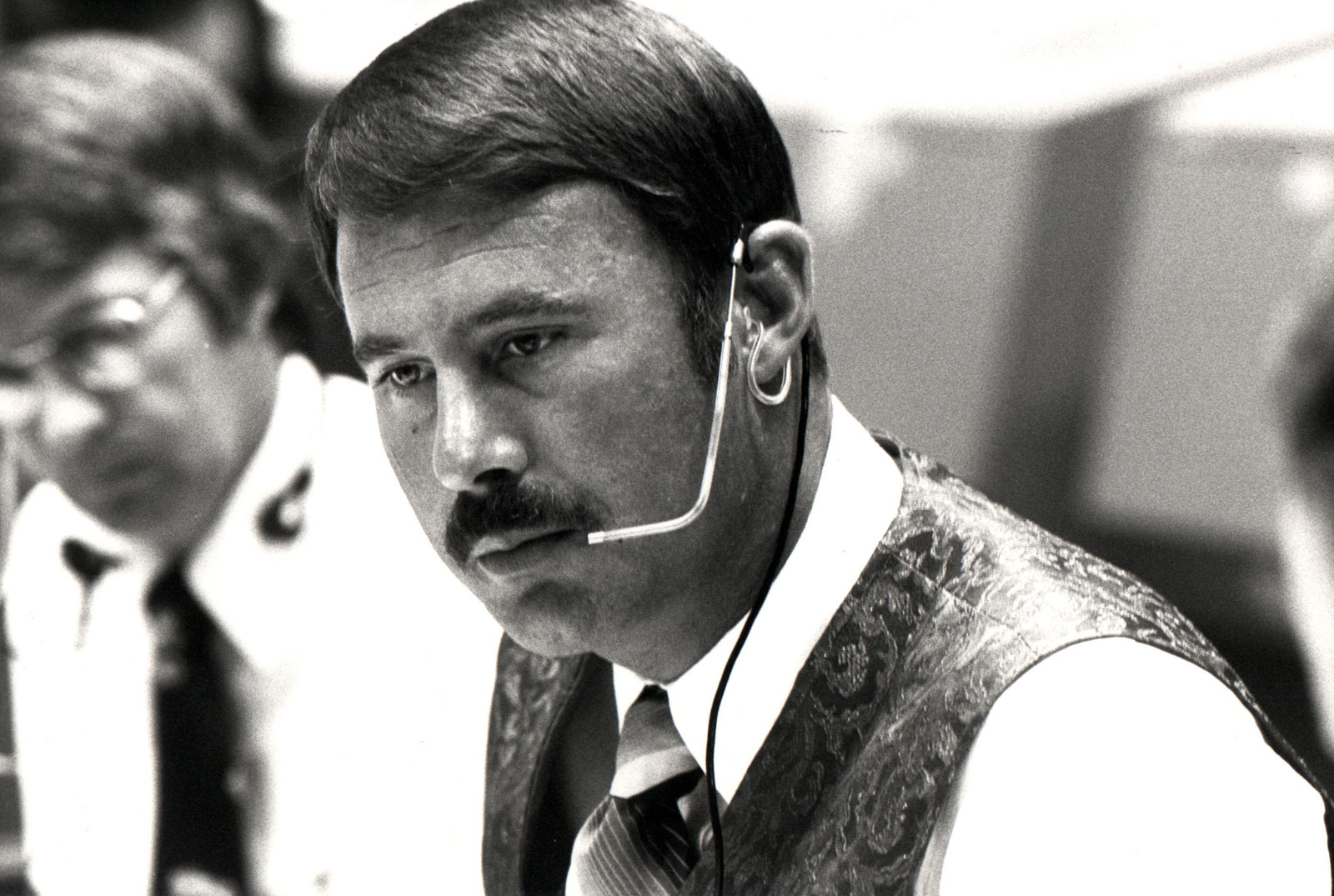
Don Puddy in Mission Control

Donald Ray Puddy (May 31, 1937 – November 22, 2004) was a NASA engineer and manager. He joined NASA in 1964, eventually becoming the agency's tenth flight director. His Flight Team colors were Crimson. He served as a flight director during the Apollo 17, Skylab, and Apollo-Soyuz Test Project missions, Skylab, and the first Space Shuttle mission. He earned a number of awards for his service, including the Presidential Medal of Freedom and the NASA Outstanding Leadership Medal.

== Early years ==
He was born in Ponca City, Oklahoma.

== NASA career ==
Puddy joined NASA in 1964. During the early years of the Apollo program he worked as a TELMU, a flight controller responsible for the electrical, life support and communications systems of the Lunar Module. He was on duty during the Apollo 11 lunar landing. He also served as head of the team that came up with many of the Lunar Module lifeboat procedures that were eventually used after the Apollo 13 accident. As part of the Apollo 13 Mission Operations Team, he received the Presidential Medal of Freedom for his role in the mission.

By the time of the Apollo 16 mission in April 1972, Puddy was training as a flight director. During that mission he served as the flight director for the Command Module for some of the time that it was undocked from the Lunar Module. Puddy went on to serve as a flight director in his own right during Apollo 17, all three Skylab missions, the Apollo-Soyuz Test Project and the first Space Shuttle mission, STS-1.

In 1987, following the departure of George Abbey, Puddy became the new head of the Flight Crew Operations Directorate (FCOD) at Johnson Space Center. In this position he would be responsible for the assignment of astronauts to missions. Many astronauts had hoped that a fellow astronaut would be chosen to fill the position. "Don was an exceptionally talented engineer and manager," astronaut Mike Mullane wrote. "But he wasn't a pilot... He just wasn't the best man for the job."

After his time in the FCOD, Puddy played a role in the Shuttle-Mir program as Special Assistant for US/Russian Programs. In this role he negotiated with both Russian organizations and American companies, and traveled many times to Star City to meet with his Russian counterparts.

He retired from NASA in October 1995. He was inducted into the Oklahoma Aviation and Space Hall of Fame in 2002.
