= Danny Flynn (artist) =

English writer

Danny Flynn (born in Scunthorpe, Lincolnshire) is an English fantasy and science fiction artist. Flynn attended Saint Augustine Webster Primary School and High Ridge Comprehensive in his birth town Scunthorpe, and took a degree in Illustration at Kingston University.

Since the mid-1980s, Flynn has illustrated and designed novel covers, some for well-known authors including Frederik Pohl, Greg Bear, Isaac Asimov, Robert A. Heinlein and Arthur C. Clarke. He also worked for game companies Electronic Arts and Traveller's Tales.

== See also ==
- List of space artists
