= Luděk Pešek =

- Born: 26 April 1919; Kladno, Czechoslovakia
- Died: 4 December 1999 (aged 80); Stäfa, Switzerland
- Citizenship: Swiss
- Education: Academy of Fine Arts, Prague
- Occupations: Artist, novelist
- Known for: Representations of astronomical subjects

Signature
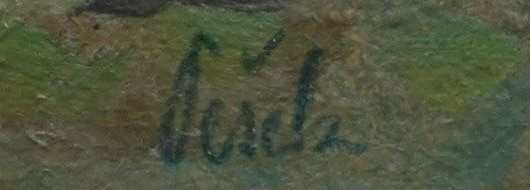

Luděk Pešek (26 April 1919 – 4 December 1999) was a Czech artist and novelist. He was noted for his representations of astronomical subjects. The asteroid 6584 Ludekpesek is named after him. He was influenced by Lucien Rudaux.

== Biography ==
Luděk Pešek was born in 1919 in Kladno, Czechoslovakia, and grew up in the city of Ostrava. His boyhood was marked by the longing for mountains, and distant lands, laying the ground for his later interest in geology and astronomy. His potential artistic and literary talents were recognized early, and encouraged by his art teacher at grammar school. It was also on that occasion, that he first had the opportunity to use an astronomical telescope. At the age of fifteen, Pešek acquired a painter's easel, and began to practice his hobby earnestly. Later, he attended the Academy of Fine Arts in Prague.

He produced his first art works around the age of 19. His first publications were The Moon and Planets (1963), and Our Planet Earth (1967). His work first reached US readers through the National Geographic Magazine, which commissioned him to do a series of works about Mars. Previous to the Mars article, he had painted 15 scenes for an article called Journey to the Planets in August 1970. In 1967, Pešek wrote his first science-fiction novel, Log of a Moon Expedition, which he illustrated in black and white. Another, The Earth Is Near, won Prize of Honour in Germany in 1971. It was published in the UK and United States in 1974. He illustrated Space Shuttles in 1976. He worked with writer Peter Ryan on several slim books for children: Journey to the Planets (1972), Planet Earth (1972), The Ocean World (1973), and UFOs and Other Worlds (1975); he later worked with the same author on the large-format Solar System (1978). He also illustrated the excellent Bildatlas des Sonnensystems (1974), with German text by Bruno Stanek.

From 1981 to 1985, he produced a series of 35 paintings on The Planet Mars, and a series of 50 paintings, Virgin Forests in the USA, one of which can be seen on the Earth page.

He produced several 360-degree panoramas for projection in the domes of the planetariums at Stuttgart, Winnipeg and Lucerne, and exhibited in Washington, D.C., Boston, Nashville, Stuttgart, Bern, Lucerne, Zürich, and other venues. His work is in the collection of the Smithsonian Institution.

He died in Stäfa, Switzerland.

== Books in English ==
- The Moon and the Planets – by Josef Sadil and Luděk Pešek – 1963
- Log of a Moon Expedition – 1969 ISBN 0001844555
- Journey to the Planets – by Peter Ryan and Luděk Pešek – 1972 ISBN 0140610014
- The Ocean World – by Peter Ryan and Luděk Pešek – 1973 ISBN 0582153778
- The Earth is Near – 1974 ISBN 0878880666
- UFOs and Other Worlds – by Peter Ryan and Luděk Pešek – 1975 ISBN 0140610170
- An Island for Two – 1975 ISBN 0722652232
- A Beautiful, Peaceful World – by Hans-Joachim Gelberg and Willi Glasauer – 1976 ISBN 3407805187
- Solar System – by Peter Ryan and Luděk Pešek – 1978 ISBN 0713910437
- Trap For Perseus – 1980 ISBN 0878881603

== See also ==
- List of space artists
