= Out of the Cradle (book) =

1984 book by William K. Hartmann

- Author: William K. Hartmann
- Illustrator: William K. Hartmann; Ron Miller; Pamela Lee
- Cover artist: Pamela Lee
- Subject: Planetary exploration
- Publisher: Workman
- Publication date: September 1984
- Pages: 190
- ISBN: 0-89480-770-6
- Preceded by: The Grand Tour: A Traveller's Guide to the Solar System (1981)
- Followed by: Cycles of Fire (1987)

Out of the Cradle: Exploring the Frontiers beyond Earth is a 1984 book written and illustrated by planetary scientist William K. Hartmann, Ron Miller and Pamela Lee. Cradle describes potential crewed space missions to the planets, moons and asteroids of the Solar System. The approximately 100 space art illustrations were in large part based on photographs from the uncrewed space probes Pioneer 11, Voyager 1, and the Viking Lander, available at the time of publication, with scientific extrapolation of the likely appearance of various planetary surfaces. The title is derived from a quote from Konstantin Tsiolkovsky, included in the preface: "Earth is the cradle of humanity, but one cannot live in the cradle forever."

The book is notable for introducing Hartmann's 'golden rule' of space exploration (on p. 182):

Space exploration must be carried out in a way so as to reduce, not aggravate, tensions in human society.

== Contents ==
- Preface by William K. Hartmann
- Prologue: The Solar System as Our Backyard
- The Beginning
- Alternatives: A Future Without Space?
- From Shuttles to Space Cities
- Robot Astronauts
- Return to the Moon
- Asteroids and Comets: Our First Landfalls Beyond the Moon
- Martians - In Myth and Reality
- Phobos and Deimos: Depots on the Road to Mars
- Into the Realm of Ice and Fire
- The Search for Life
- Epilogue: The Golden Rule of Space Explorations

== Reception ==
Cradle has received positive critical academic reviews, including from the Journal of the Royal Astronomical Society of Canada. It has been recommended as a teaching aid for science classes.
