= Robert McCall (artist) =

American artist (1919–2010)

Robert T. McCall
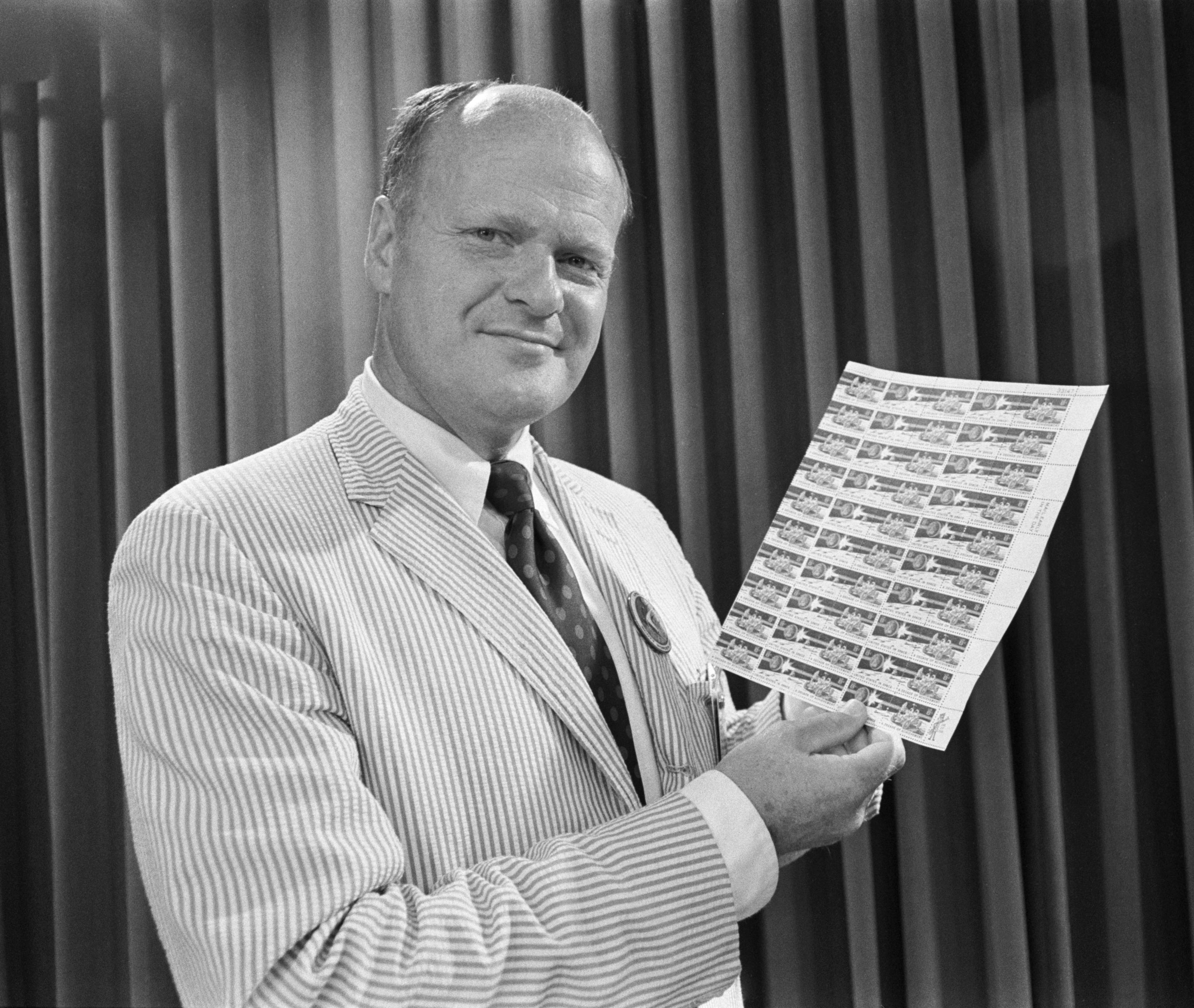
- Robert McCall with commemorative stamps (1971)
- Born: December 23, 1919; Columbus, Ohio, U.S.
- Died: February 26, 2010 (aged 90); Scottsdale, Arizona, U.S.
- Known for: Painting, illustrations
- Website: http://www.mccallstudios.com

Robert Theodore McCall (December 23, 1919 – February 26, 2010) was an American artist, best known for his space art works.

== Work ==
McCall was an illustrator for Life magazine in the 1960s, created promotional artwork for Stanley Kubrick's film 2001: A Space Odyssey (1968) and Richard Fleischer's production Tora! Tora! Tora! (1970) and worked as an artist for NASA, documenting the history of the Space Race. McCall was also production illustrator on Star Trek: The Motion Picture (1979) and Walt Disney's The Black Hole (1979). The character Commander William Riker expressed admiration for the work of "Bob McCall" in one episode of the television series Star Trek: The Next Generation.

McCall's work can be found on U.S. postage stamps, and also NASA mission patches such as for Apollo 17.

He has created murals for the walls of the National Air and Space Museum, the National Gallery of Art, The Pentagon, Epcot, and Lyndon B. Johnson Space Center. McCall was also commissioned by The Walt Disney Company to do a painting called "The Prologue and The Promise" for the Epcot attraction, Horizons in 1983. Guests could see the mural at the end of the attraction as they exited.

McCall appeared as an imposter for a U.S. Air Force pilot on the June 24, 1963 episode of To Tell the Truth. He received one of the four possible votes from the panel.

McCall died in 2010 of heart failure in Scottsdale, Arizona.

== Books ==
- Our World in Space, 1974, text by Isaac Asimov, illustrations by Robert McCall
- The Art of Robert McCall: A Celebration of our Future in Space, Bantam Books, 1992, introduction by Ray Bradbury ISBN 0-553-07355-9
- Vision of the Future: The Art of Robert McCall, text by Ben Bova, illustrations by Robert McCall.

== Gallery ==
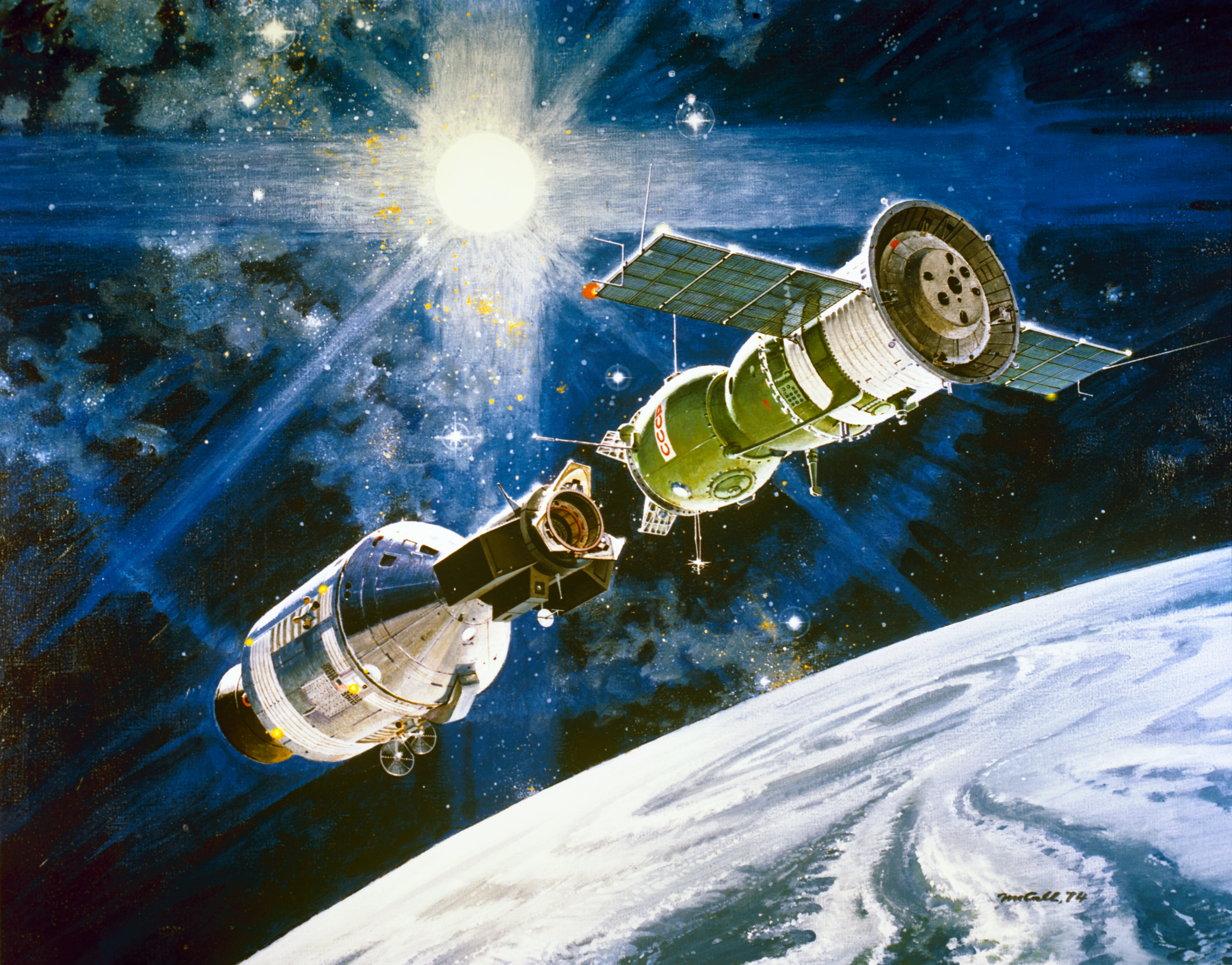
Apollo Soyuz Program, 1974

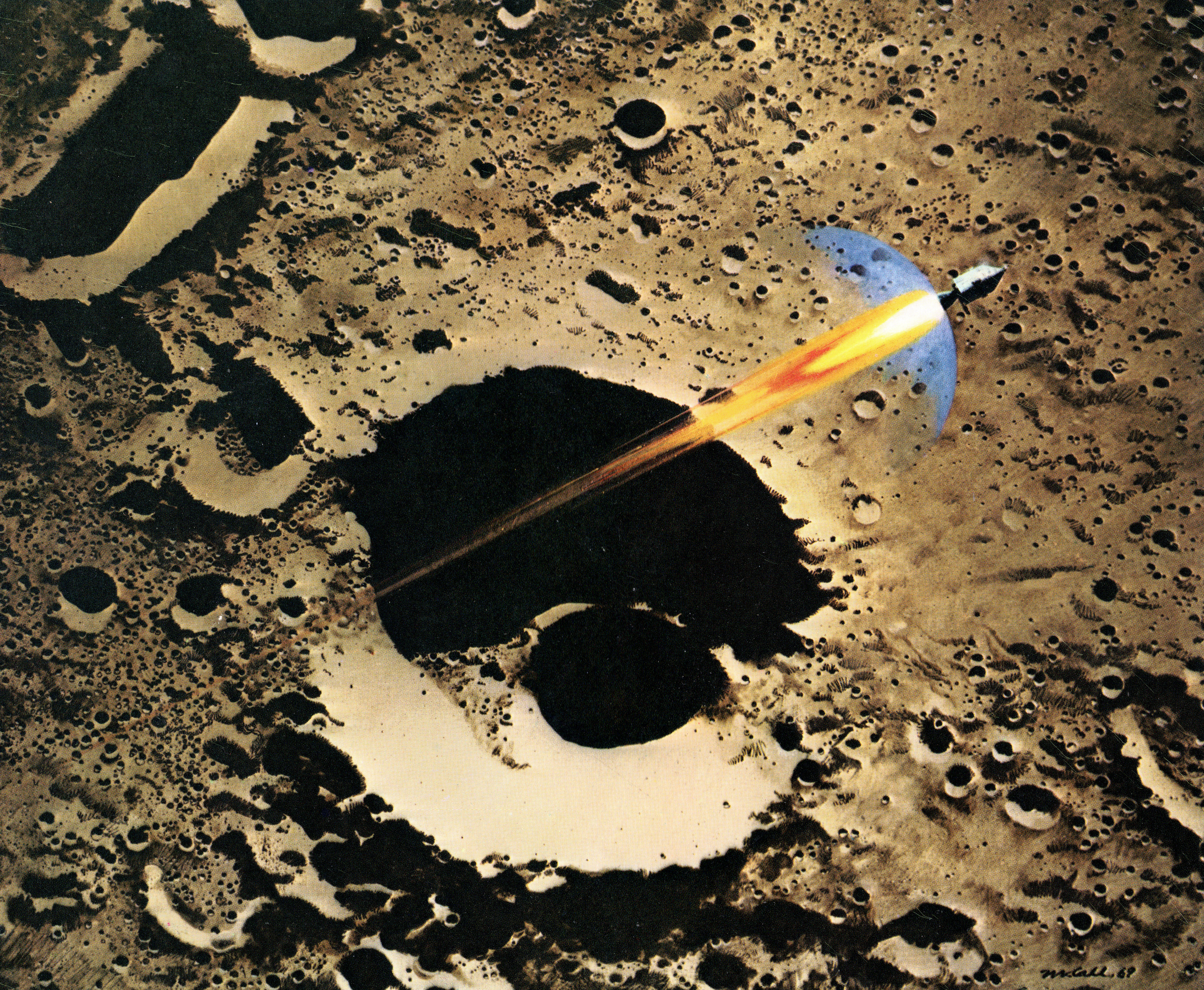
Apollo 8 Coming Home, 1971

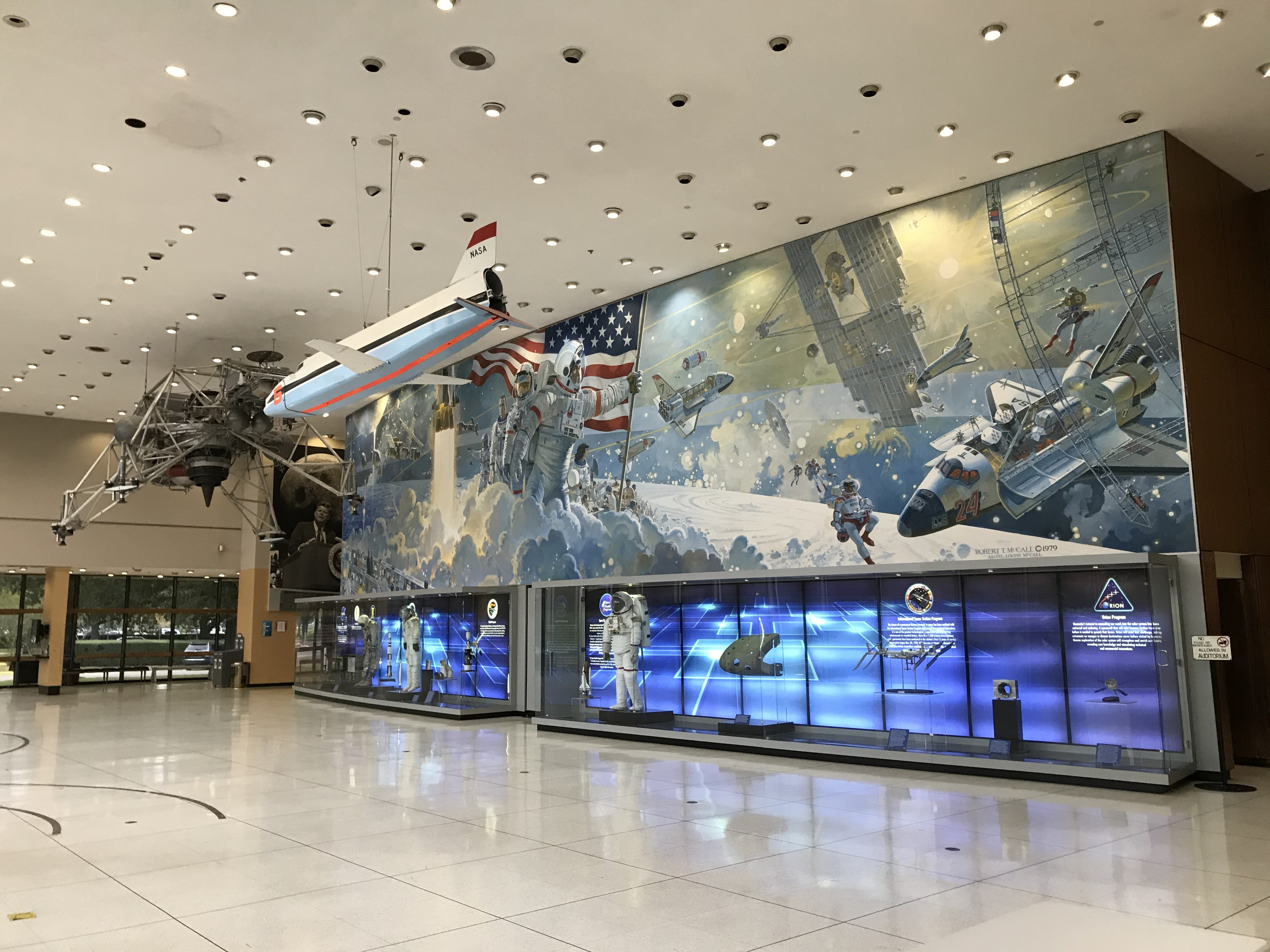
Teague Auditorium Lobby mural

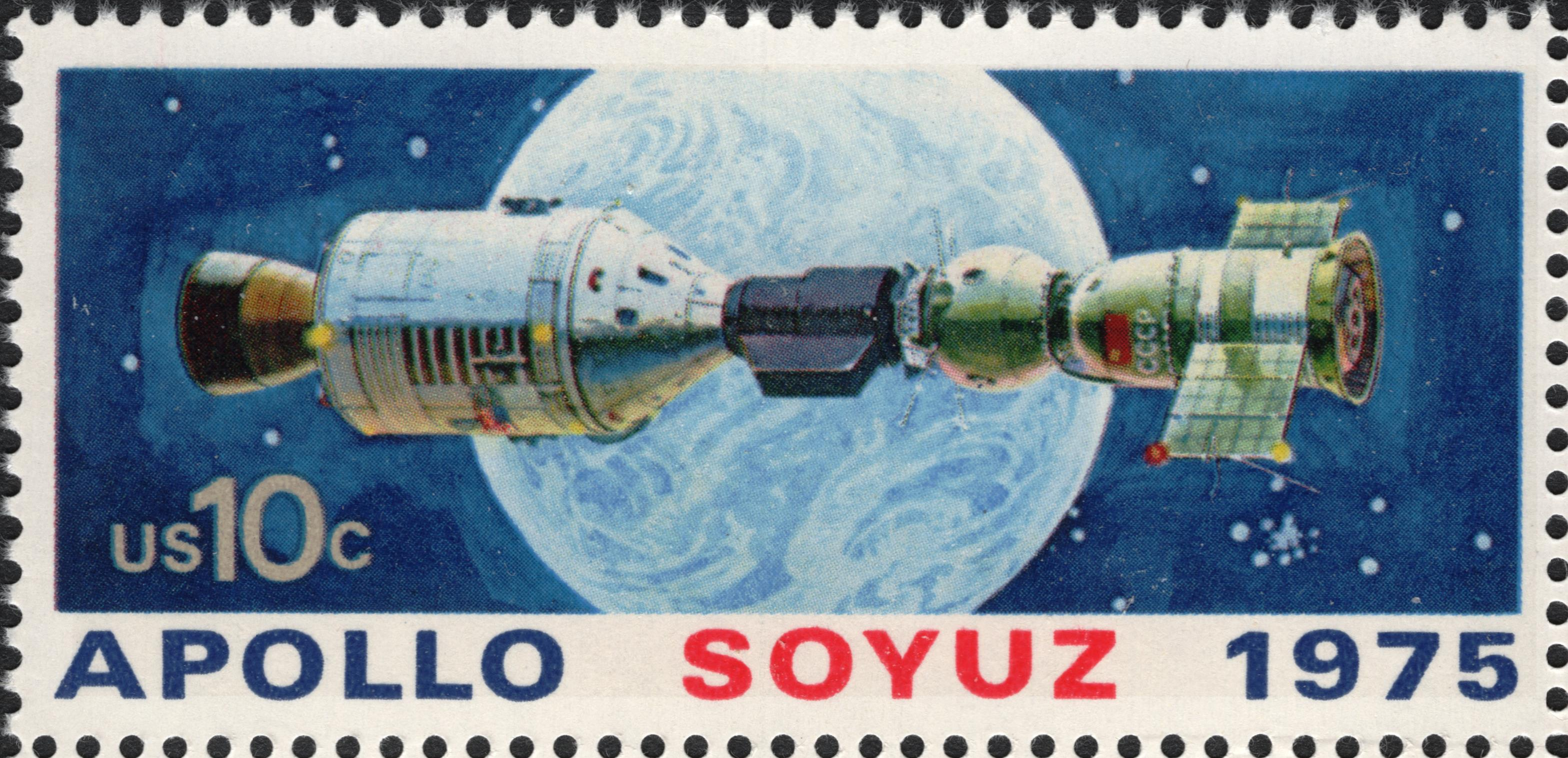
U.S. stamp design, Apollo & Soyuz After Docking, 1975

== See also ==
- List of space artists

Similar artists

- Chesley Bonestell
- Joe Johnston
- Ralph McQuarrie
