= Ron Miller (artist and author) =

American illustrator and writer (born 1947)

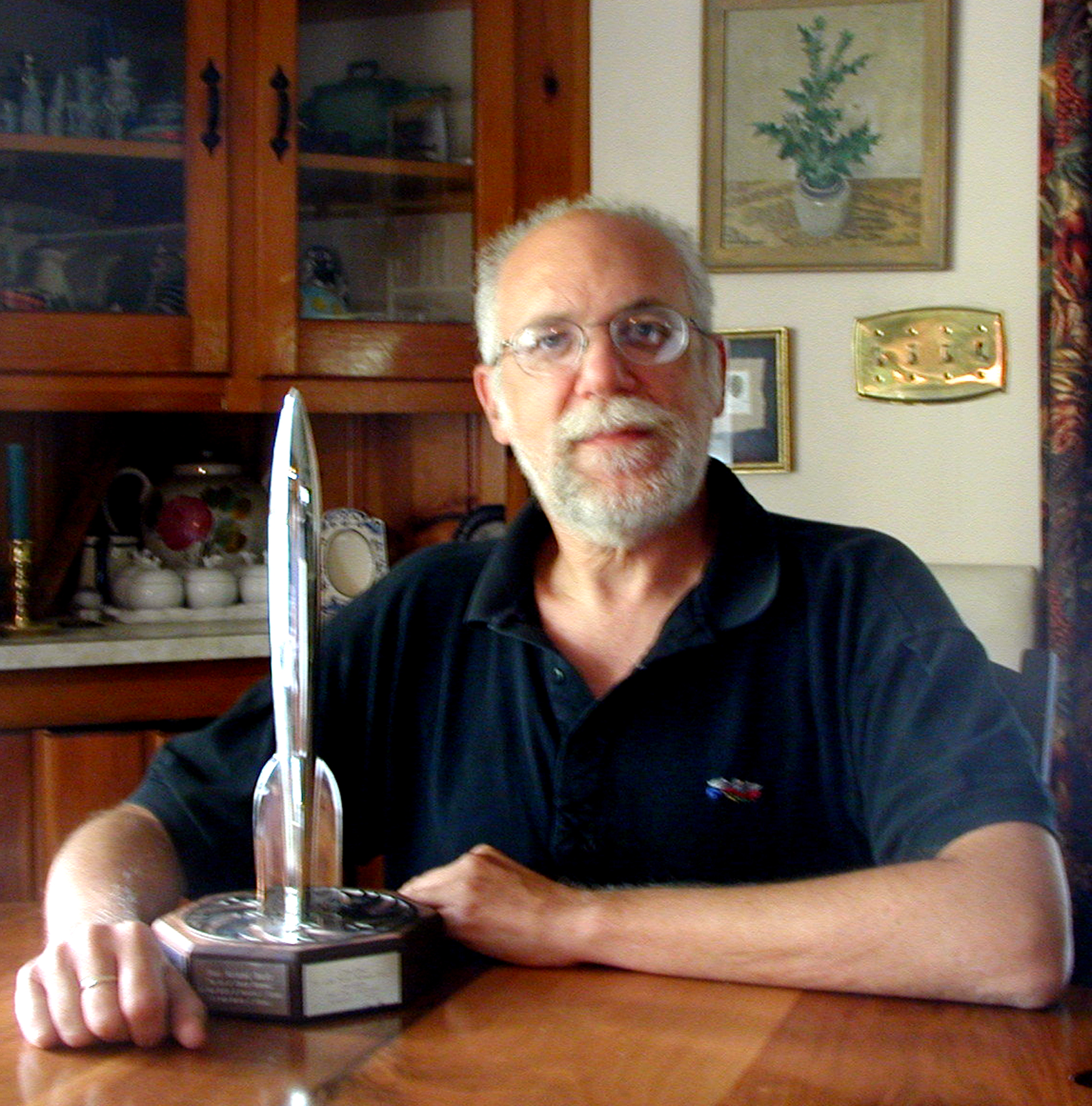
- Ron Miller, space artist, science fiction illustrator and author.
- Born: May 8, 1947 (age 79); Minneapolis, Minnesota, U.S.
- Education: Bachelor of Fine Arts
- Occupations: Illustrator, writer
- Spouse: Judith
- Children: Patricia

Ron Miller (born May 8, 1947) is an American illustrator and writer who lives and works in South Boston, Virginia. He now specializes in astronomical, astronautical and science fiction books for adults and young adults.

Miller was born in Minneapolis, Minnesota. He holds a BFA from Columbus, Ohio, College of Art and Design. He worked as a commercial artist and designer for six years, before taking a position as art director for the National Air and Space Museum's Albert Einstein Planetarium. He left there in 1977 to become a freelance illustrator and author; to date he has nearly sixty book titles to his credit, and his illustrations have appeared on hundreds of book jackets, book interiors and in magazines such as Reader's Digest, Scientific American, Smithsonian, Analog, Starlog, Air & Space, Astronomy, Sky & Telescope, Science et Vie, Newsweek, Natural History, Discover, GEO and others. and Journey to the Center of the Earth as well as a companion/atlas to Verne's works, Extraordinary Voyages. He has acted as a consultant on Verne for Walt Disney Imagineering (for the Paris Disneyland) and A&E Television Network's Biography series. Miller's book The Dream Machines, a comprehensive 744-page history of crewed spacecraft, was nominated for the International Astronautical Federation's Manuscript Award and won the Booklist Editor's Choice Award. His original paintings are in numerous private and public collections, including the Smithsonian Institution and the Pushkin Museum (Moscow).

He designed a set of ten commemorative postage stamps for the U.S. Postal Service. One of the stamps in the Space Exploration series (1991), is credited with helping inspire the New Horizons mission to that planet. The Pluto stamp was attached to the spacecraft before launch. The stamp is now in the Guinness Book of World Records as having traveled further than any other postage stamp in history. He has been a production illustrator for motion pictures, notably Dune and an unproduced version of Total Recall; and he designed and co-wrote the computer-generated show ride film, Comet Impact! for SimEx. He has provided concept and special effects art for numerous other directors. Most recently he was a co-producer of the documentary film, "A Brush With the Future."

Miller has been part of the NASA Fine Arts Program and has taken part in international space art workshops and exhibitions, including seminal sessions held in Iceland and the Soviet Union. He was invited by the Soviet government to the 30th anniversary celebration of the launch of Sputnik, and has lectured on space art and space history in the United States, France, Japan, Italy and Great Britain. He was featured on Hour 25 Science Fiction Radio program in early 2003.

An authority on the work of astronomical artist Chesley Bonestell, his book The Art of Chesley Bonestell received a Hugo Award in 2002. A feature-length documentary based on this book, "A Brush With the Future," for which he was co-producer, won the Audience Award at the Newport Beach Film Festival and Best Documentary at San Diego Comic-Con. Other books have received awards, including a Silver Award for best fiction from ForeWord magazine for Palaces & Prisons and the Violet Crown Award from the Writers' League of Texas for Bradamant. His Worlds Beyond series received the American Institute of Physics Award of Excellence. The Grand Tour has gone through three editions, multiple printings, several translations, was a Hugo Award nominee and has sold over 250,000 copies. It was also twice a Book-of-the-Month feature selection. This and other books have been selections of the Science, Quality Paperback and Science Fiction Book Clubs. His book, Digital Art, was listed on the VOYA (Voice of Youth Advocates) Nonfiction Honor List in 2009. In all, he has 75 works in 142 publications in 6 languages in 16,977 libraries world-wide.

In addition to his novels he has had several short stories anthologized. A series of short stories based on the title character of his novel, Velda, have been published monthly in Black Cat Magazine with 65 stories published to date. One story in the series was recently selected for inclusion in Best Private Eye Stories of 2025 (edited by Michael Bracken, Level Best Books).

Miller has been on the faculty of the International Space University. He is a contributing editor for Air & Space/Smithsonian magazine; a member of the International Academy of Astronautics; a member of the History Committee of the American Astronautical Society; a Life Member, Fellow and past Trustee of the International Association of Astronomical Artists; member Private Eye Writers of America; an Honorary Member of the Sociétè Jules Verne (Paris); a past member of the North American Jules Verne Society and a past Fellow of the British Interplanetary Society.

== Published books ==
- The Space Art Poster Book (Stackpole, 1979)
- Space Art (Starlog, 1979)
- The Grand Tour (Workman, 1981; revised edition, 1993; revised edition, 2005) with William K. Hartmann
- Worlds Beyond: The Art of Chesley Bonestell (Donning, 1983) with Frederick C. Durant, III
- Out of the Cradle (Workman, 1984) with William K. Hartmann
- Cycles of Fire (Workman, 1987) with William K. Hartmann
- Stars and Planets (Doubleday, 1987) Illustrator
- Mathematics (illustrator: Doubleday, 1989) Illustrator
- 20,000 Leagues Under the Sea (Unicorn, 1988) Illustrator and translator
- In the Stream of Stars (Workman, 1990) with William K. Hartmann; foreword by Ray Bradbury
- The Bronwyn Trilogy: Palaces & Prisons, Silk & Steel, Hearts & Armor (Ace, 1991–1992) Novels; rewritten and published as A Company of Heroes (Baen Books, 2014) along with the additional fourth and fifth volumes, The Scientist and The Space Cadet
- The History of Earth (Workman, 1992) with William K. Hartmann
- The Dream Machines (Krieger, 1993) Foreword by Arthur C. Clarke
- Extraordinary Voyages (Black Cat Press, 1994) Foreword by Forrest J. Ackerman
- BrainQuest (Workman, 1994)
- Firebrands (Paper Tiger, 1998) Illustrator
- 20,000 Leagues Under the Sea (Dorling Kindersley, 1998) Adaptation
- The History of Rockets (Grolier, 1999)
- Bradamant (Timberwolf, 2000; revised edition issued as The Iron Tempest, Baen Books, 2014) Novel
- The History of Science Fiction (Grolier, 2001)
- The Art of Chesley Bonestell (Paper Tiger, 2001) with Frederick C. Durant, III, foreword by Arthur C. Clarke
- Velda (Timberwolf Press, 2003) Novel
- Worlds Beyond (twelve-book series, Millbrook Press, 2002–2005): Earth & Moon; Saturn; The Sun; Mars; Venus; Uranus & Neptune; Extrasolar Planets; Mercury & Pluto; Jupiter; Asteroids, Comets & Meteors; Stars & Galaxies
- Special Effects in the Movies (Millbrook Press, 2006)
- The Elements (Millbrook Press, 2004)
- The Space Cadet, part of the Company of Heroes series published by Baen Books, 2014)
- Space Innovations (four-book series, Lerner, 2007–2008): Rockets, Satellites, Robot Explorers, Space Exploration
- Extreme Aircraft (HarperCollins, 2007)
- Digital Art (Lerner, 2007)
- Cleopatra (Chelsea House, 2008) with Sommer Browning; foreword by Arthur M. Schlesinger, Jr.
- The Seven Wonders of Engineering (Lerner, 2009)
- The Seven Wonders of the Gas Giants (Lerner, 2010)
- The Seven Wonders Beyond the Solar System (Lerner, 2010)
- The Seven Wonders of the Rocky Planets (Lerner, 2010)
- The Seven Wonders of Comets, Asteroids and Meteors (Lerner, 2010)
- Is the End of the World Near? (Lerner, 2011)
- Journey to the Exoplanets (Farrar, Straus and Giroux, 2011) iPad book app; with Edward Bell
- Recentering the Universe (Lerner, 2013)
- Storm Chasers (Lerner, 2013)
- Exploring Mars (Lerner, 2013)
- The Art of Space (Zenith, 2014), forewords by Dan Durda and Caroline Porco
- Return to Skull Island (Baen Books, 2014) with Darrell Funk
- Velda: Girl Detective (Caliber Comics, 2015), 3-volume comic anthology
- Spaceships (Smithsonian Books, 2016), forewords by Lance Bush and Tom Crouch
- The Zoomable Universe (Farrar, Straus and Giroux, 2017), illustrator
- Aliens: Past, Present, Future (Watkins Publishing, 2017), Author and illustrator
- Space Stations (Smithsonian Books, 2018), co-author, foreword by Nicole Stott
- The Beauty of Space (Springer Nature, 2020), co-editor and contributor
- Natural Satellites: The Book of Moons (Lerner, 2021)
- Envisioning Exoplanets (Smithsonian, 2020), illustrator
- Space Science and Public Engagement (Elsevier, 2021), contributor
- Alien Invasions (IDW, 2021), contributor
- The Big Backyard: The Solar System Beyond Pluto (Lerner, 2022)
- Disturbing Stories by Ron Miller (Fantastic Books, 2024) short story collection
- To the Stars: The Story of NASA (Lerner, 2025)
- Bang! A History of Fireworks (Lerner, 2025)

== Awards ==
- Lucien Rudaux Memorial Award for Lifetime Achievement in Astronomical Art, IAAA, 2003
- Frank R. Paul Award for Outstanding Achievement in Science Fiction Art, Nashville, 1988
- Award of Merit, Art Director's Club of Washington, DC, 1981
- Hugo Award for Best Related Work, 2002: The Art of Chesley Bonestell
- ForeWord Magazine Book of the Year, Silver Fiction Award, 2001: Palaces and Prisons (book one of The Company of Heroes series)
- Award of Excellence in Science Writing from American Institute of Physics, 2003: Worlds Beyond series
- Nominee for 1982 Hugo Award for best nonfiction for The Grand Tour
- Ten Best Books of the Year, 1984—Astronomical Society of the Pacific: Out of the Cradle
- Ten Best Books of the Year, 1987—Astronomical Society of the Pacific: Cycles of Fire
- Outstanding Science Trade Book, National Science Teachers Assoc./Children's Book Council, 1987: Stars and Planets
- New York Public Library Books for the Teen Age, 1992: The History of Earth
- IAF Manuscript Award. Booklist Editor's Award, 1994: The Dream Machines
- New York Public Library Books for the Teen Age, 2000: Rockets
- Children's Book Committee at Bank Street College Best Children's Book of the Year, 2005: Venus
- National Science Teachers Association (NSTA) / Children's Book Council (CBC) Outstanding Science Trade Books for Students K-12, 2005: The Elements
- VOYA (Voice of Youth Advocates) Nonfiction Honor List, 2009: Digital Art
- 2001 Writer's League of Texas Violet Crown Award for best audiofiction: Bradamant
- 2012 SSLI (Society of School Librarians International) Book Award, Honor Book in the Science 7-12 category: Is the End of the World Near?
- NSTA/CBC Outstanding Science Trade Books for Students K-12: The Elements
- Junior Library Guild Selection; nominee for Library of Virginia Literary Award for Non-Fiction: Recentering the Universe
- Best Children's Books of the Year, 2015, Children's Book Committee at the Bank Street College of Education: Curiosity's Mission on Mars
- Finalist, Locus Award for Best Art Book, 2014: The Art of Space
- Ordway Award for Sustained Excellence in Spaceflight History, 2018
- Audience Award, Newport Beach Film Festival, for "A Brush With the Future" (co-producer) 2018
- Best Documentary, San Diego Comic-Con, for "A Brush With the Future" (co-producer) 2018
- Best Documentary, Boston Sci-Fi Film Festival, for "A Brush With the Future (co-producer) 2019
- Longlist for the 2019 AAAS/Subaru SB&F Prize for Excellence in Science Books, "Zoomable Universe"
- 2021 Joseph V. Canzani Alumni Award for Excellence (Columbus College of Art and Design)
- Bank Street College of Education's 2024 The Best Children's Books of the Year in the 14 to 17 category for The Big Backyard, which was also noted as a title with Outstanding Merit.
- Notable Award School Library Journal Best Book of the Year 2023, The Big Backyard
