= William Kenneth Hartmann =

American planetary scientist (born 1939)

William K. Hartmann
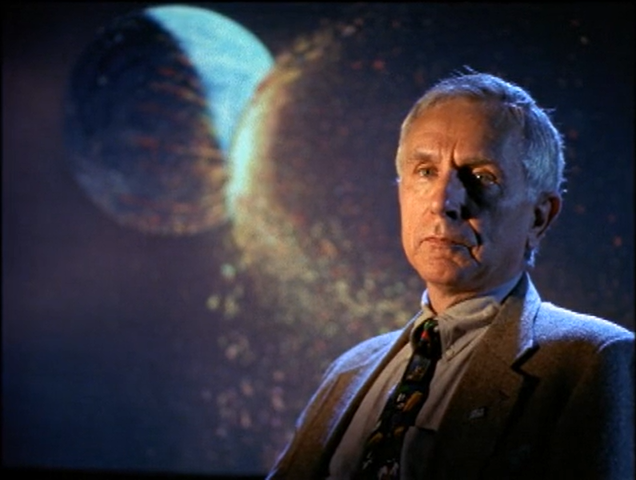
- Hartmann being interviewed in 1998
- Born: June 6, 1939 (age 87); New Kensington, Pennsylvania, U.S.
- Education: Pennsylvania State University; University of Arizona
- Awards: G.K. Gilbert Award, Carl Sagan Medal for Excellence in Public Communication in Planetary Science
- Scientific career
- Fields: Planetary science
- Workplaces: Planetary Science Institute

William Kenneth Hartmann (born June 6, 1939) is an American planetary scientist, artist, author, and writer. He was the first to convince the scientific mainstream that the Earth had once been hit by a planet sized body (Theia), creating both the Moon and the Earth's 23.5° tilt.

== Early life and education ==
Hartmann was born in Pennsylvania in 1939. He was awarded a Bachelor of Science degree (B.S.) in physics from Pennsylvania State University, and both a Master of Science degree (M.S.) in geology and Doctor of Philosophy (PhD) in astronomy from the University of Arizona.

== Career ==
Hartmann's career spans over 40 years, from work in the early 1960s with Gerard Kuiper on Mare Orientale, and work on the Mariner 9 Mars mapping project, to work on the Mars Global Surveyor imaging team. He is currently a senior scientist at the Planetary Science Institute.

He has long been one of America's leading space artists (strongly influenced by Chesley Bonestell), and has written and illustrated numerous books on the history of Earth and the Solar System, often in collaboration with artist Ron Miller.

Hartmann is a Fellow of the International Association of Astronomical Artists. His written work also includes textbooks, short fiction, and novels, the most recent being published in 2003. In 1997 he was the first recipient of the Carl Sagan Medal for Excellence in Public Communication in Planetary Science from the American Astronomical Society, Division for Planetary Sciences.

Hartmann was a member of the 1966–1968 University of Colorado UFO Project (informally known as the Condon Committee), a controversial public study of UFOs sponsored by the U.S. Air Force. He primarily investigated photographic evidence, and rejected most as unreliable or inconclusive; in his studies published in the committee's final report, he concluded two cases - Great Falls (motion pictures of two bright light sources difficult to reconcile with known aircraft) and McMinnville (two photographs of a saucer-shaped craft) - were unexplained and particularly noteworthy as probative evidence of the reality of UFOs.

Asteroid 3341 Hartmann is named after him.

== Bibliography ==
- Out of the Cradle: Exploring the Frontiers beyond Earth, with Ron Miller and Pamela Lee (1984)
- The History of Earth: An illustrated chronicle of an evolving planet, with Ron Miller (1991)
- Mars Underground, (1999) Tor Science Fiction, ISBN 978-0-8125-8039-6
- The Grand Tour: A Traveler's Guide to the Solar System, with Ron Miller (1st edition 1981, 2nd edition 1993, 3rd edition 2005)
- A Traveler's Guide to Mars: The Mysterious Landscapes of the Red Planet, (2003) Workman Pub Co, ISBN 978-0-7611-2606-5

== See also ==
- Giant impact hypothesis
- Viktor Safronov
