= Nick Cave discography =

Solo discography of Australian recording artist Nick Cave

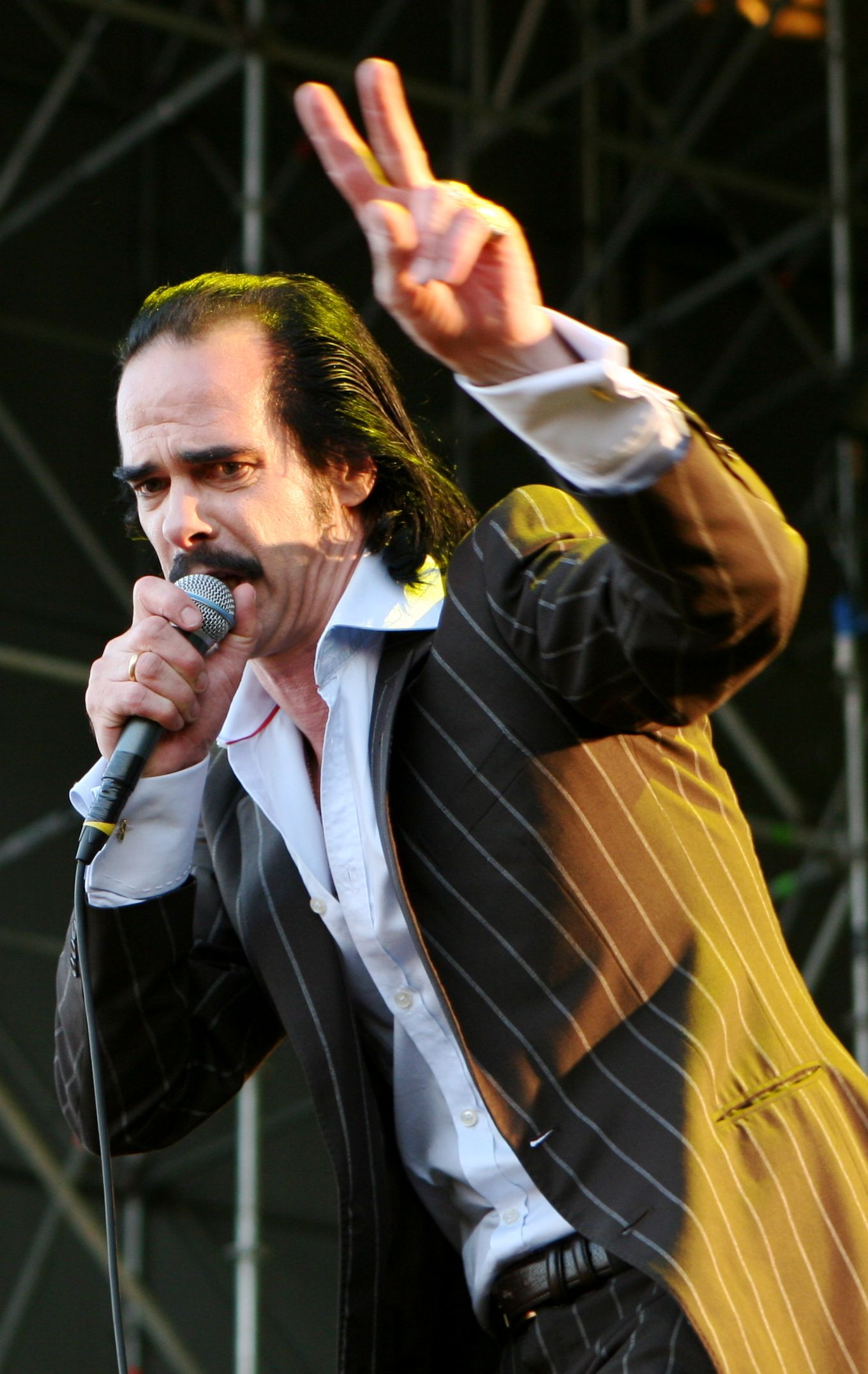
- Studio albums: 1
- EPs: 1
- Soundtrack albums: 11
- Live albums: 4
- Compilation albums: 1
- Singles: 3
- Short soundtrack: 2

This is the discography of Australian singer-songwriter Nick Cave. In addition to his career as lead singer of Nick Cave and the Bad Seeds, he has released 1 studio album, 11 soundtrack albums, 1 extended play, 2 short soundtracks, 3 singles, 3 live albums, and 1 compilation album. Since 2005, the majority of his work has been written and recorded in collaboration with Bad Seeds member and multi-instrumentalist Warren Ellis.

== Studio ==
=== Albums ===
Year	Title	Notes
2021	Carnage	with Warren Ellis

=== Soundtracks ===
Year	Title	Notes
1989	Ghosts... of the Civil Dead	with Blixa Bargeld & Mick Harvey
2005	The Proposition	with Warren Ellis
2007	The Assassination of Jesse James by the Coward Robert Ford	with Ellis
2009	The Road	with Ellis
2012	West of Memphis	with Ellis
2014	Far from Men	with Ellis
2016	Mars	with Ellis
2017	War Machine	with Ellis
2017	Wind River	with Ellis
2017	Kings	with Ellis
2021	La Panthère des neiges	with Ellis
2022	Dahmer – Monster: The Jeffrey Dahmer Story	with Ellis
2022	Blonde	with Ellis
2024	Back to Black	with Ellis

=== EPs ===
Year	Title	Notes
2022	Seven Psalms	featuring Ellis

=== Short soundtracks ===
Year	Title	Notes
2012	Days of Grace	with Warren Ellis
2016	Hell or High Water	with Ellis

=== Singles ===
Year	Title	Notes
1992	"What a Wonderful World"/"Rainy Night in Soho"	Bob Thiele & George David Weiss and the Pogues cover, "What a Wonderful World" with Shane MacGowan
2002	"Bad Cover Version"	split single with Pulp, a cover of "Disco 2000"
2022	"Letter to Cynthia"	featuring Warren Ellis, backed with instrumental version
2022	"Letter to Daniel & Vera"	featuring Warren Ellis, backed with instrumental version

=== Other appearances ===
Year	Title	Release	Notes
1989	"Helpless"	The Bridge	Neil Young cover
1993	"Faraway, So Close!" and "Cassiel's Song"	Faraway, So Close!	original songs
1995	"There Is a Light"	Batman Forever	original song
1996	"Time Jesum Transeuntum et Non Riverentum" and "X-Files Theme"	Songs in the Key of X	with Dirty Three
1997	"Mack the Knife"	September Songs: The Music of Kurt Weill	Bertolt Brecht & Kurt Weill cover
1998	"The Big Hurt" and "Mojo"	Mojo	"The Big Hurt" with Gallon Drunk, 1997 film
1999	"Goodbye Marylou"	A Tribute to Polnareff	Michel Polnareff cover
2001	"To Be by Your Side"	Winged Migration	original song
2002	"Let It Be" and "Here Comes the Sun" (bonus track)	I Am Sam	The Beatles cover, 2001 film
2006	"Fire Down Below" and "Pinery Boy"	Rogue's Gallery: Pirate Ballads, Sea Songs, and Chanteys	traditional songs
2010	"Ramblin' Mind" and "Free to Walk"	We Are Only Riders: The Jeffrey Lee Pierce Sessions Project	based on Jeffrey Lee Pierce demos, "Free to Walk" with Debbie Harry
2011	"She's Not There"	True Blood: Volume 3	The Zombies cover with Neko Case
2012	"City in Pain" and "The Breaking Hands"	The Journey Is Long: The Jeffrey Lee Pierce Sessions Project	based on Jeffrey Lee Pierce demos, "The Breaking Hands" with Debbie Harry
2013	"Pirate Jenny"	Son of Rogues Gallery: Pirate Ballads, Sea Songs & Chanteys	traditional song with Shilpa Ray and Warren Ellis
2014	"Nobody's City"	Axels & Sockets: The Jeffrey Lee Pierce Sessions Project	based on Jeffrey Lee Pierce demo, with Iggy Pop
2015	"All the Gold in California"	True Detective	Larry Gatlin cover with Ellis
2020	"Cosmic Dancer"	AngelHeaded Hipster: The Songs of Marc Bolan & T.Rex	T. Rex cover
2022	"Wood Dove"	For the Birds: The Birdsong Project, Vol. 1	with Ellis
2024	"Slap That Bass" / "Get Happy" / "What the World Needs Now Is Love"	Joker: Folie à Deux (Music from the Motion Picture)	Covers
2026	Wichita Lineman	Honora	Glen Campbell cover, from the debut solo album by Flea

== Live ==
=== Albums ===
- Live at Hammersmith Apollo (2015)
- Live at the Royal Albert Hall (2015)
- Idiot Prayer (Nick Cave Alone at Alexandra Palace) (2020)
- Australian Carnage – Live at the Sydney Opera House (2023)

=== Other appearances ===
- Nick Cave i Przyjaciele (Nick Cave and Friends) (1999). A live tribute album by Polish musicians. Cave appears on "Into My Arms" and "The Weeping Song".
- "I'm Your Man" and "Suzanne" performed by Cave in the documentary/concert film Leonard Cohen: I'm Your Man (2006).
- The Harry Smith Project: Anthology of American Folk Music Revisited (2006), Concert album featuring Nick Cave performing "John the Revelator" and "Shine on Me".

== Compilation ==
- White Lunar, soundtrack compilation (2009) – composed with Ellis (2CDs). Disc one contains highlights from The Proposition, The Assassination of Jesse James by the Coward Robert Ford, and The Road. Disc 2 contains excerpts from unreleased soundtracks as well as four unreleased pieces from their archives.

== Session work ==
- Send Me a Lullaby (1981), album by The Go-Betweens, features Cave's vocals on "After the Fireworks".
- Burnin' the Ice (1982), album by Die Haut features Cave's vocals on "Stow-a-Way", "Truck Love", "Pleasure Is the Boss", "Dumb Europe".
- Annie Hogan Plays "Kickabye" EP (1985), features Cave's vocals and production on "Vixo". Recorded in October 1983.
- Oedipus Schmoedipus (1996), album by Barry Adamson, Cave appears on "The Sweetest Embrace".
- "Music for Expelling the Demon" (1999), a short animation by Devlin Crow, written by A-Soma.
- Punishing Kiss (2000), album by Ute Lemper, Cave co-wrote (with Bruno Pisek) "Little Water Song".
- Next Wave (2002), album by Chris Coco, Cave performs a cover version of The Velvet Underground's "Sunday Morning" with Chris Coco.
- American IV: The Man Comes Around (2003) duet with Johnny Cash on "I'm So Lonesome I Could Cry".
- Small World Big Band Friends 3 – Jack o the Green (2003), album by Jools Holland, "Kiss of Love" duet with Sam Brown.
- I Started Out with Nothin' (2008), album by Seasick Steve, "Just Like a King" includes Cave's vocals.
- The Real Work (2022), album by Party Dozen, Cave features on "Macca the Mutt".

== Unreleased soundtracks ==
- The English Surgeon (2007) – excerpts released on White Lunar
- The Girls of Phnom Penh (2009) – excerpts released on White Lunar
- Lawless (2012) – "End Crawl" released on Lawless various artists album
- The Case Against Adnan Syed (2019) – unreleased

== Compositions ==
- To Have and to Hold (1996) – film score to John Hillcoat's film of the same name, with Blixa Bargeld and Mick Harvey.
- Woyzeck (2005) – theatre score composed with Warren Ellis
- The Metamorphosis (2006) – theatre score composed with Ellis
- Faust (2009) – theatre score composed with Ellis
- Shell Shock (2014) – opera with libretto by Cave
- L.I.T.A.N.I.E.S (2020) – opera with libretto by Cave

== Readings ==
- "The Atra Virago or the Vargus Barking Spider" (1987) – excerpt of And the Ass Saw the Angel, from Smack My Crack
- "And the Ass Saw the Angel" (1988) – further excerpts, released with Tender Prey
- The Secret Life of the Love Song & the Flesh Made Word: Two Lectures (2000)
- The Death of Bunny Munro (2009) – 7-disc audiobook, with backing music composed with Ellis
