= Space art =

Visual art genre about outer space

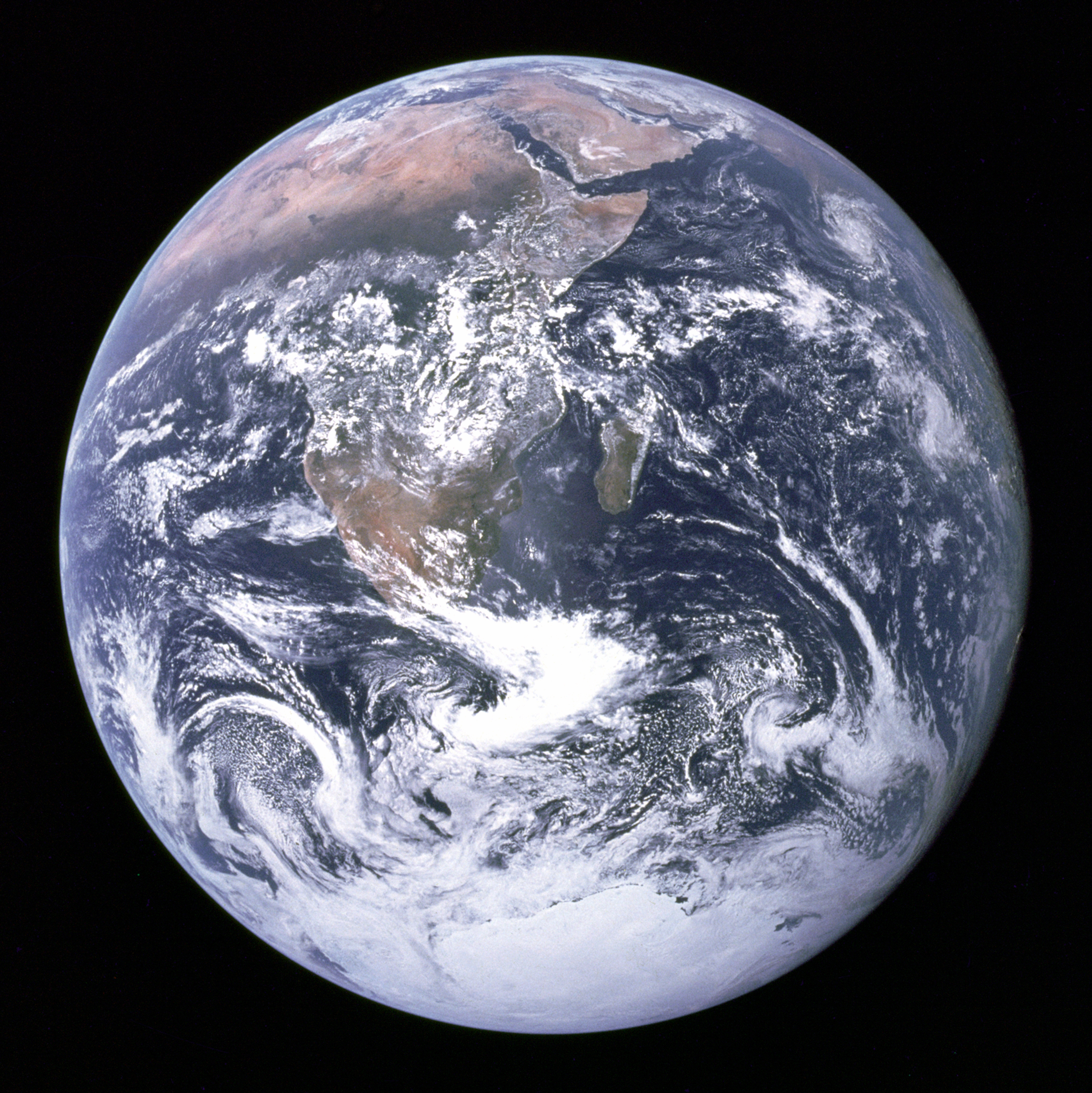
The famous The Blue Marble, Earth as seen from Apollo 17 (1972), an example of space photography.

Space art, also known as astronomical art, is a genre of art that visually depicts the universe through various artistic styles. It may also refer to artworks sent into space.

The development of space art was closely linked to advancements in telescope and imaging technology, which enabled more precise observations of the night sky. Some space artists work directly with scientists to explore new ways to expand the arts, humanities, and cultural expressions relative to space. Space art may communicate ideas about space, often including an artistic interpretation of cosmological phenomena and scientific discoveries.

For many decades, visual artists have explored the topic of space using traditional painting media, followed recently by the use of digital media for the same purpose. Science-fiction magazines and picture essay magazines were some of the first major outlets for space art, often featuring planets, spaceships, and dramatic alien landscapes. Chesley Bonestell, R. A. Smith, Lucien Rudaux, David A. Hardy, and Ludek Pesek were some of the artists actively involved in visualizing topics such as space exploration and colonization in the early days of the genre. Astronomers and experts in rocketry also played roles in inspiring artists in this genre.

NASA's second administrator, James E. Webb, created the space agency's Space Art program in 1962, four years after its inception. Bonestell's work in this program often depicted various celestial bodies and landscapes, highlighting both the destinations and the imagined technologies used to reach them.

== Graphical art ==
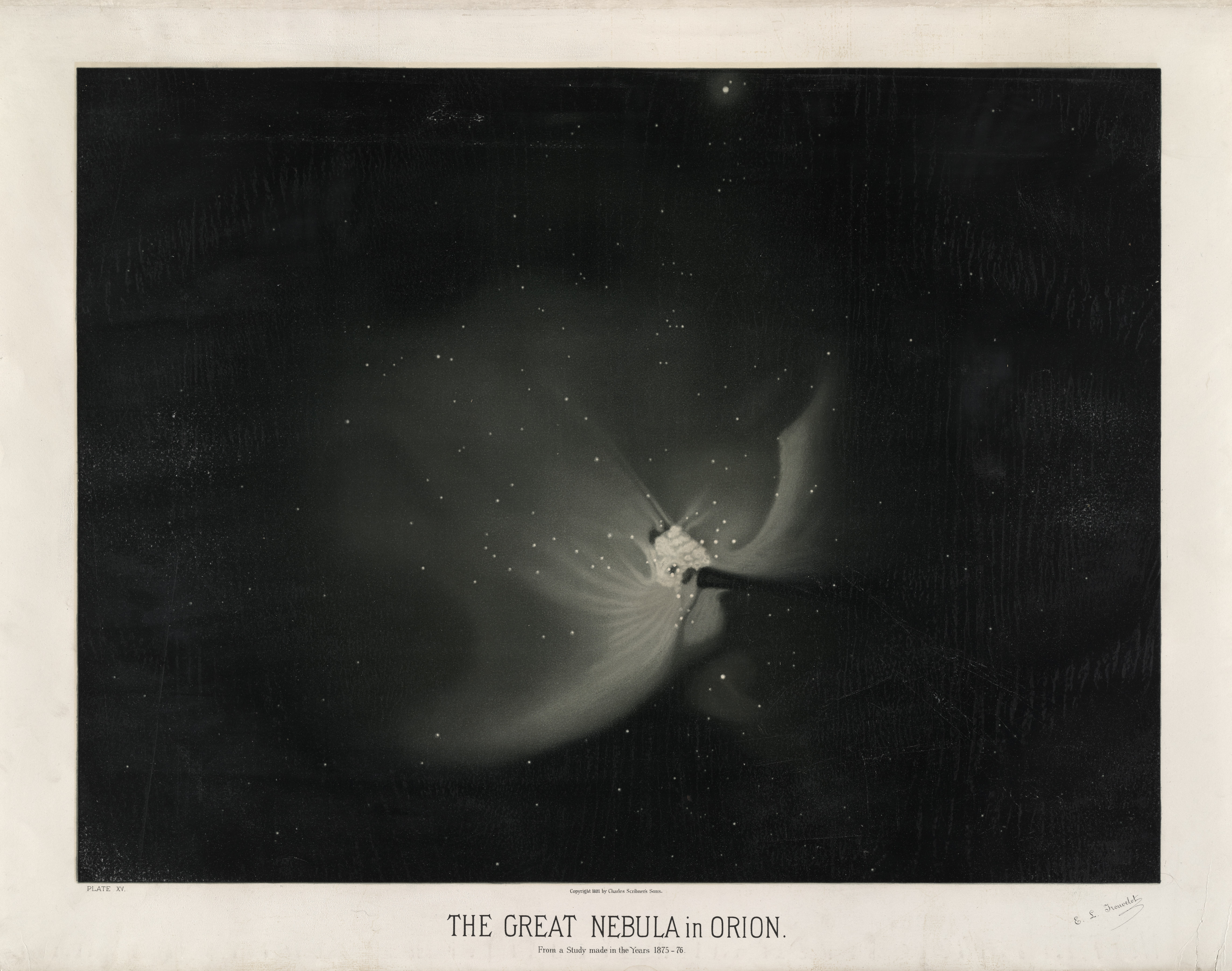
Trouvelot, The great nebula in Orion (1875).

Astronomical art is a genre of space art that focuses on visual representations of outer space. It encompasses various themes, including the space environment as a new frontier for humanity, depictions of alien worlds, representations of extreme phenomena like black holes, and artistic concepts inspired by astronomy.

Astronomical art emerged as a distinct genre in the 1940s and 1950s. Chesley Bonestell was recognized for his skills in addressing perspective challenges and creating visual representations of astronomical concepts. Contemporary artists continue to contribute to the visualization of ideas within the space community, such as depicting theoretical capabilities for interstellar travel and illustrating hypothetical deep-space phenomena.

Astronomical art is the most recent of several art movements that have explored ideas emerging from the ongoing exploration of Earth. Finding its roots in genres such as the Hudson River School or Luminism, most astronomical artists use traditional painting methods or digital equivalents in a way that brings the viewer to the frontiers of human knowledge gathered in the exploration of space. Such works usually portray things in the visual language of realism extrapolated to exotic environments, whose details reflect ongoing knowledge and educated guesswork. An example of the process of creating astronomical art would be studying and visiting desert environments to experience something of what it might be like on Mars and painting based on such experiences. Another would be to hear of an astronomical concept, and then seek out published articles or experts in the field. Usually, there is an artistic effort to emphasize the favourable visual elements, just as a photographer composes a picture. Notable astronomical art often reflects the artist's interpretation and imagination regarding the subject portrayed.

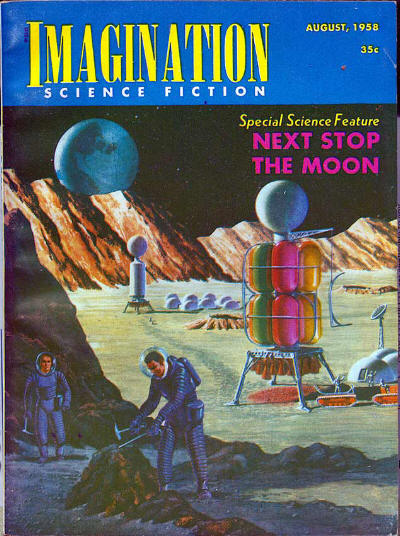
Concept art has contributed to space art significantly, particularly concepts for science fiction magazines, like for the Imagination, which foresaw space exploration in August 1958.

Science fiction magazines such as Fantasy and Science Fiction, Amazing, Astounding (later renamed Analog), and Galaxy were platforms for space and astronomical art in the 1950s. Picture essay magazines of the time, such as Life, Collier's, and Coronet, were other major outlets for such art. Today, astronomical art can be seen in magazines such as Sky and Telescope, The Planetary Report, and occasionally in Scientific American. The NASA fine arts program has been an ongoing effort to hire artists to create works generally specific to a particular space project. The program documents historical events in recognizable form for professional artists. The NASA Fine Arts Program operated in an era of forward progress under its first head director, James Dean. Even then, pictorial realism seemed a subset rather than a dominant visual influence.

The works that document space flight situations, such as those referenced above, are similar in concept to government efforts during World War II to send artists to battle zones for documentation. Much of which appeared in contemporary Life magazines. Most of today's widely published space and astronomical artists have belonged to the International Association of Astronomical Artists since 1983.

Space Invaders mosaic, video games have used space as a setting since its very beginning and has influenced space art

Computer animated scientific space art depicting T Cha

== Photography ==
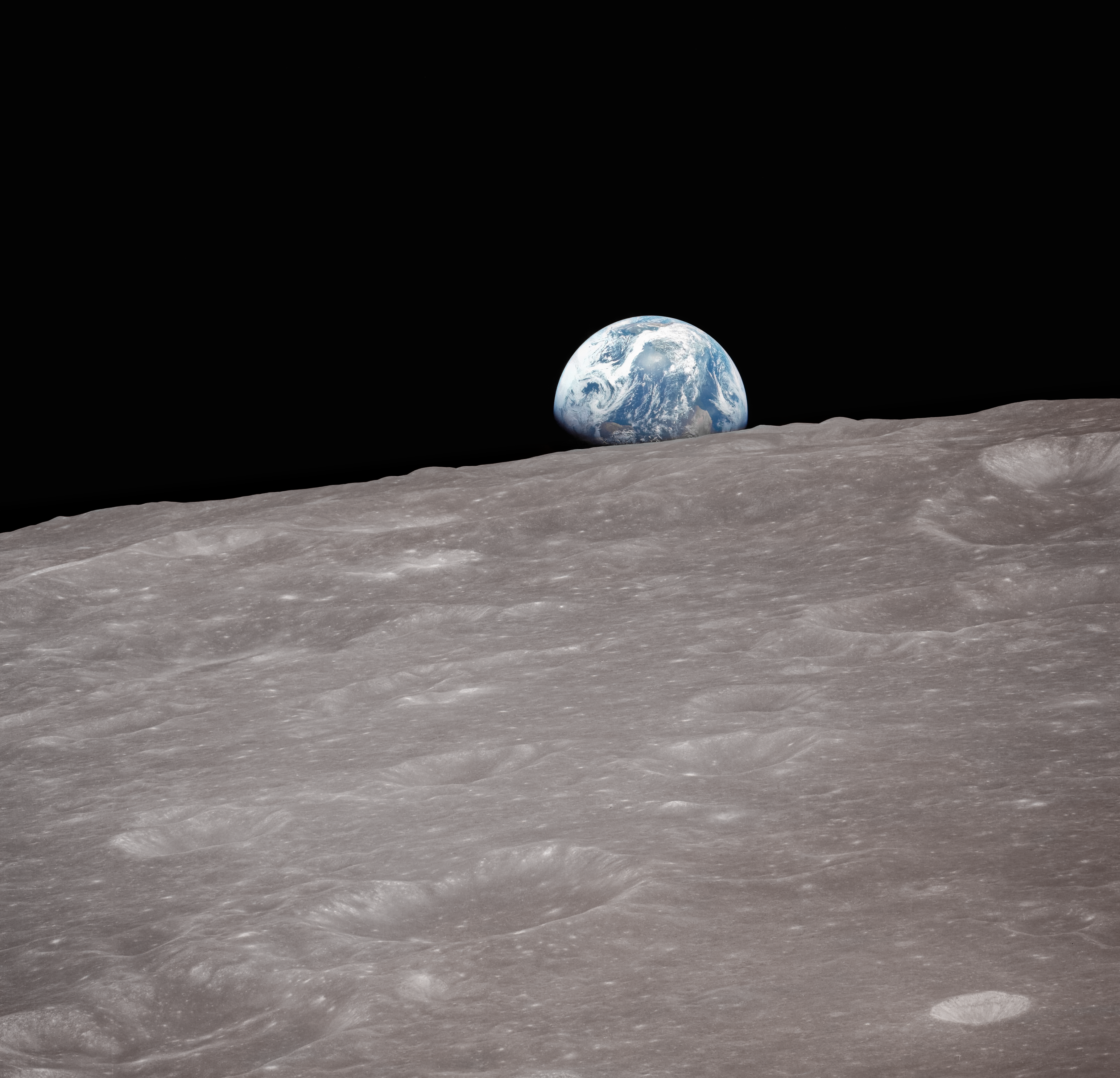
Earth over Moon - Apollo 8 - Colorization of Apollo 8 Hasselblad image from film magazine 13/E.

The first photographs of the entire Earth by satellites and crewed Apollo missions brought a new sense of Earth and promoted ideas of the unity of humanity. Photographs taken by explorers on the Moon evoked the experience of being in another world. The Pillars of Creation taken by the Hubble Space Telescope and other Hubble photos often evoke intense responses from viewers; for example, Hubble's planetary nebula images.

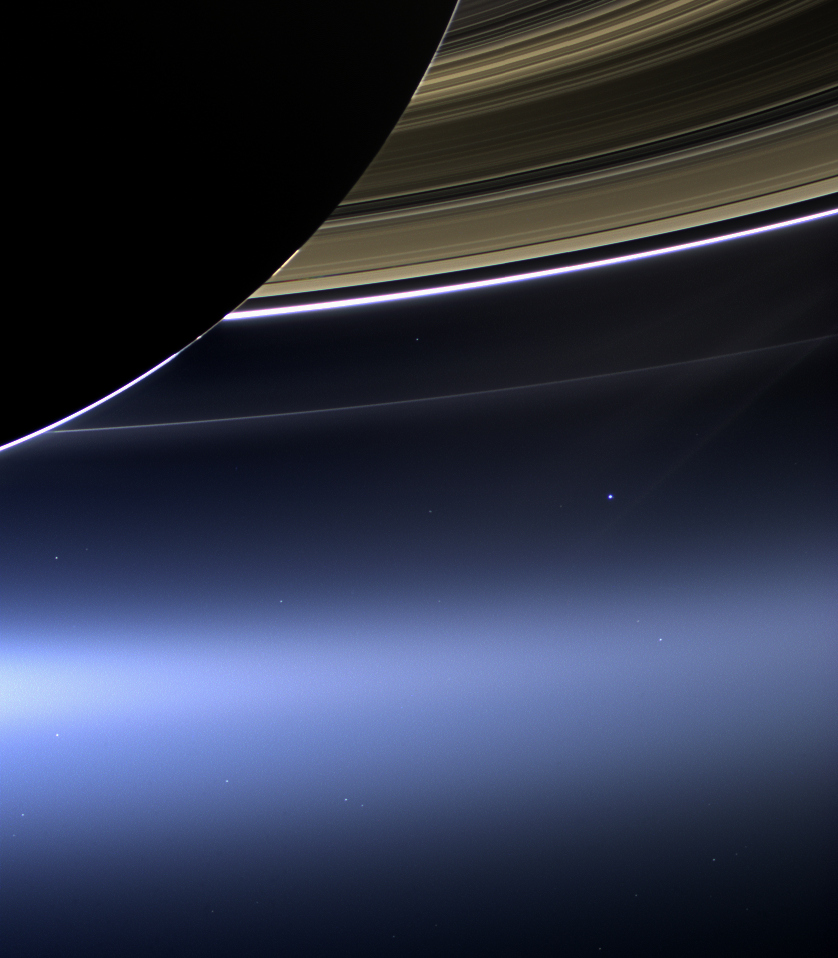
The Day the Earth Smiled. Earth can be seen underneath Saturn's rings as a pale spec.

== Music ==
Music has been used to capture a sense of the heavens and the cosmos as a whole. Traditions like musica universalis, but also Raga and Gagaku refer to space. Classical music like Heinrich Schütz's Die Himmel erzählen die Ehre Gottes (1648), the opera buffa Il mondo della luna (The World of the Moon, 1777) by Joseph Haydn the waltz Sphärenklänge (Music of the Spheres, 1868) by Johann Strauss or Gustav Holst's Die Planeten explored space. With the advent of science-fiction stories recorded on audio or film the accompanying music gained importance.

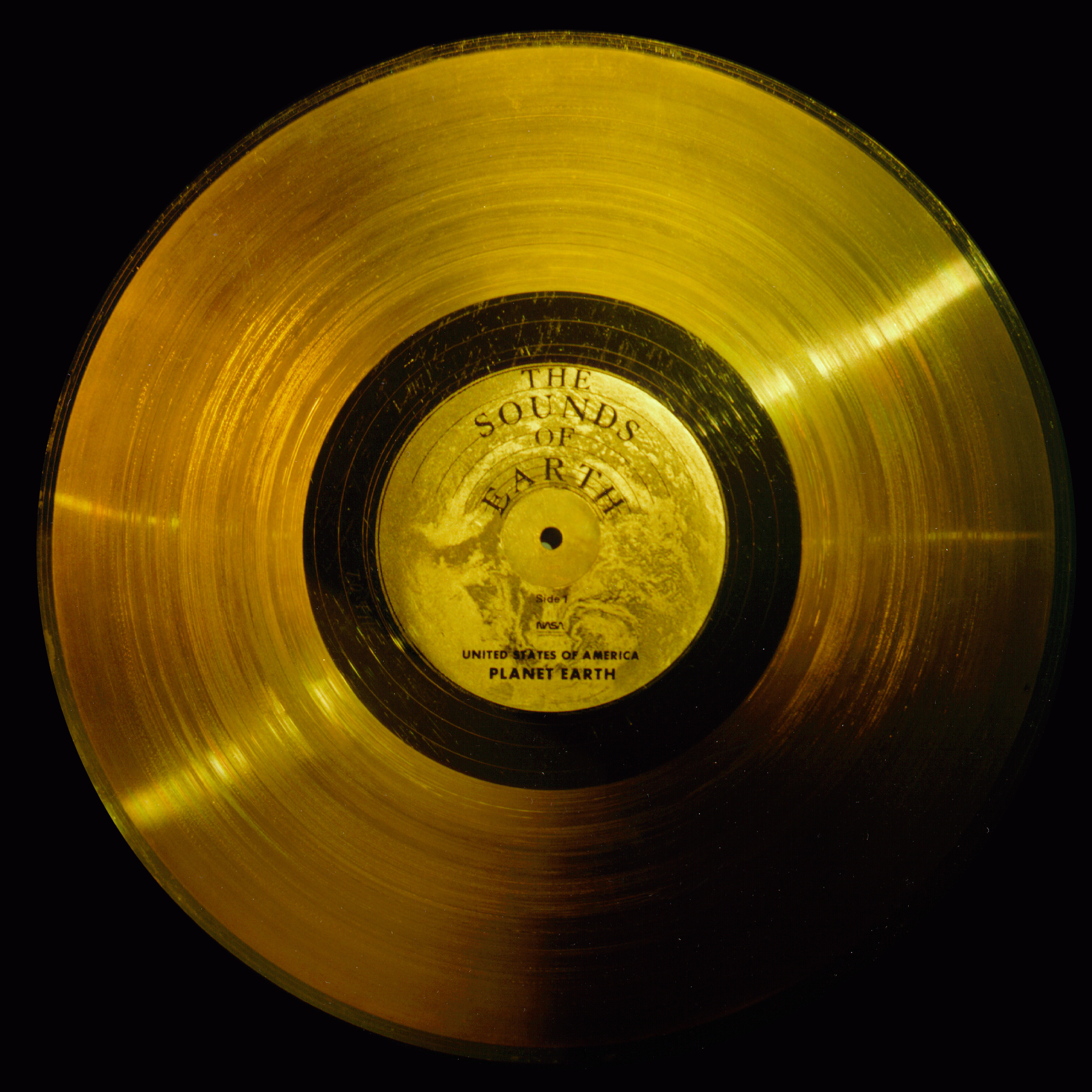
The Voyager Golden Record has taken The sounds of Earth beyond the Solar System.

Music of the space age made use of new music instruments, like the theremin or the Moog synthesizer, to create a new sound. Sonification of radio astronomic observational data, like from the Voyager program was compiled by NASA into the album Symphonies of the Planets. Kosmische Musik, or artists like Brian Eno and Brian May have developed space-themed music like of the space music genre.

Space age pop songs like Space Oddity (1969) by David Bowie have space as a topic, and have been performed in space, as by Chris Hadfield. Science-fiction actor William Shatner, who played Captain Kirk from the original Star Trek series, has built a recognized discography which often references space. The song Calling Occupants of Interplanetary Craft (1977) by The Carpenters is even the recognized anthem of the World Contact Day. Humanity's radio signals have taken signals and music, like Across the Universe, light years beyond the Solar System.

Other artists have used music to criticizes spaceflight, like Whitey on the Moon (1970) by Gil Scott-Heron or Tom Lehrer's Wernher von Braun of the 1965 album That Was the Year That Was.

NASA began the tradition of playing music to astronauts during the Gemini program, and first used music to wake up a flight crew during the Apollo 15 mission. Each track is specially chosen, often by the astronauts' families, and usually has a special meaning to an individual member of the crew or is applicable to their daily activities.

== Plastic arts and fashion ==
The Space Window (1973) of the Washington National Cathedral, incorporating a lunar rock. An example of art as a way to deal with religion in space.

Plastic arts have referenced the heavens and the cosmos from pre-historic times, most importantly for observation, like the purpose of time keeping, but also culturally, most prominently for religious sites.

With the space age architecture has added to or referenced spaceflight. Styles like Googie architecture and Soviet architectural modernism referenced space prominently.

Fashionshow 2013 inspired by Star Trek uniforms.

Fashion has likewise referenced space, but more recently space suits have become objects of style in space. Space architecture has also been exploring incorporation of artistic design.

== Fiction ==
Space has been used in different types of fiction, forming genres in science-fiction like the space opera.

== Artistry ==
Artists have experienced free-fall conditions during flights flown with NASA, the Russian and French Space Agencies, and the Zero Gravity Arts Consortium. Early efforts by artists to have art pieces placed in space have already been accomplished with painting, holography, micro-gravity mobiles, floating literary works, and sculpture.

== History ==
=== Pre-spaceflight ===
Early examples of space art are depictions of celestial bodies in ancient artifacts. The 'Land Grant to Ḫunnubat-Nanaya Kudurru,' a Babylonian limestone artifact from the 12th century BC, features early representations of Venus, the lunar crescent, and the solar disk.

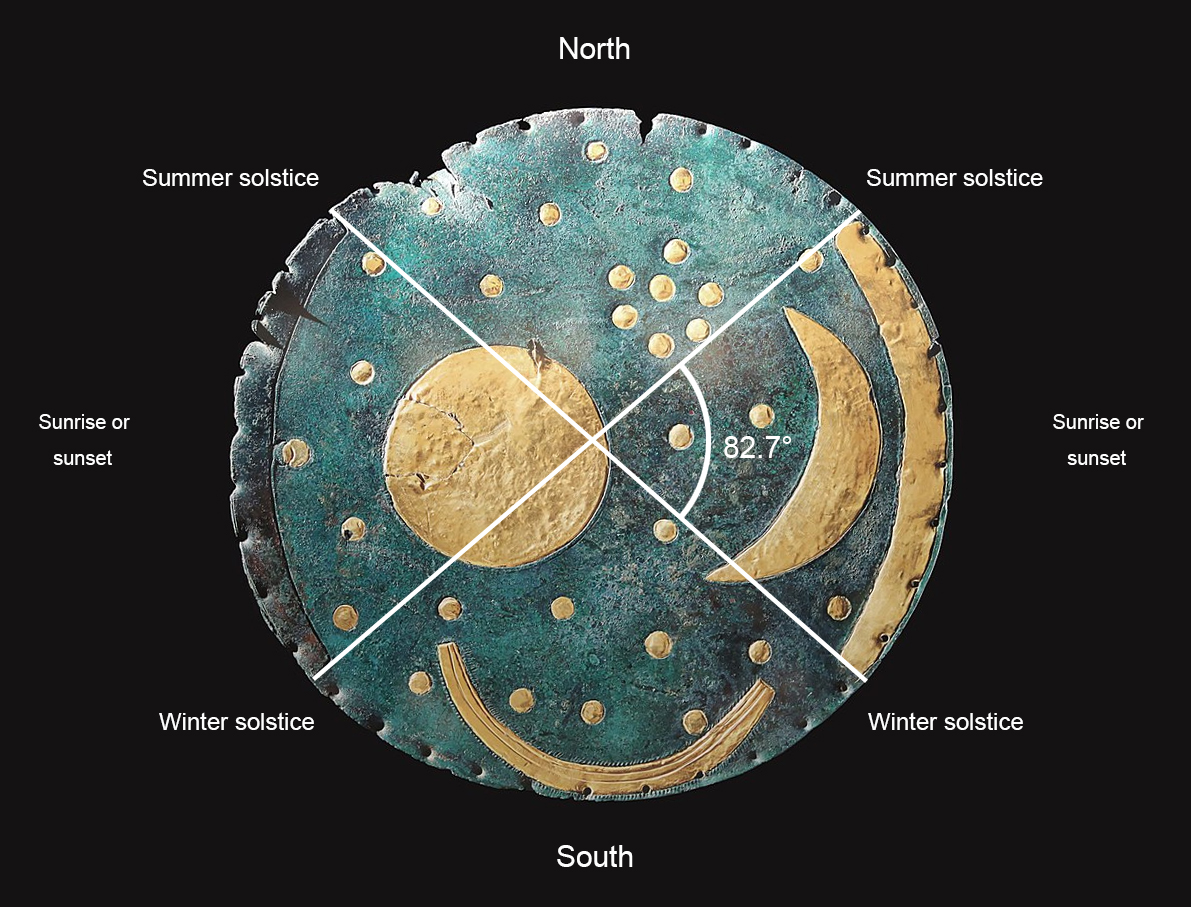
The Nebra sky disc (c. 1800–1600 BCE), one of the oldest astronomical artifacts and star chart, displaying the Sun, possibly the Pleiades and the Moon as a crescent, and gold strips on the side of the disc marking the summer and winter solstices, and the top representing the horizon and north.

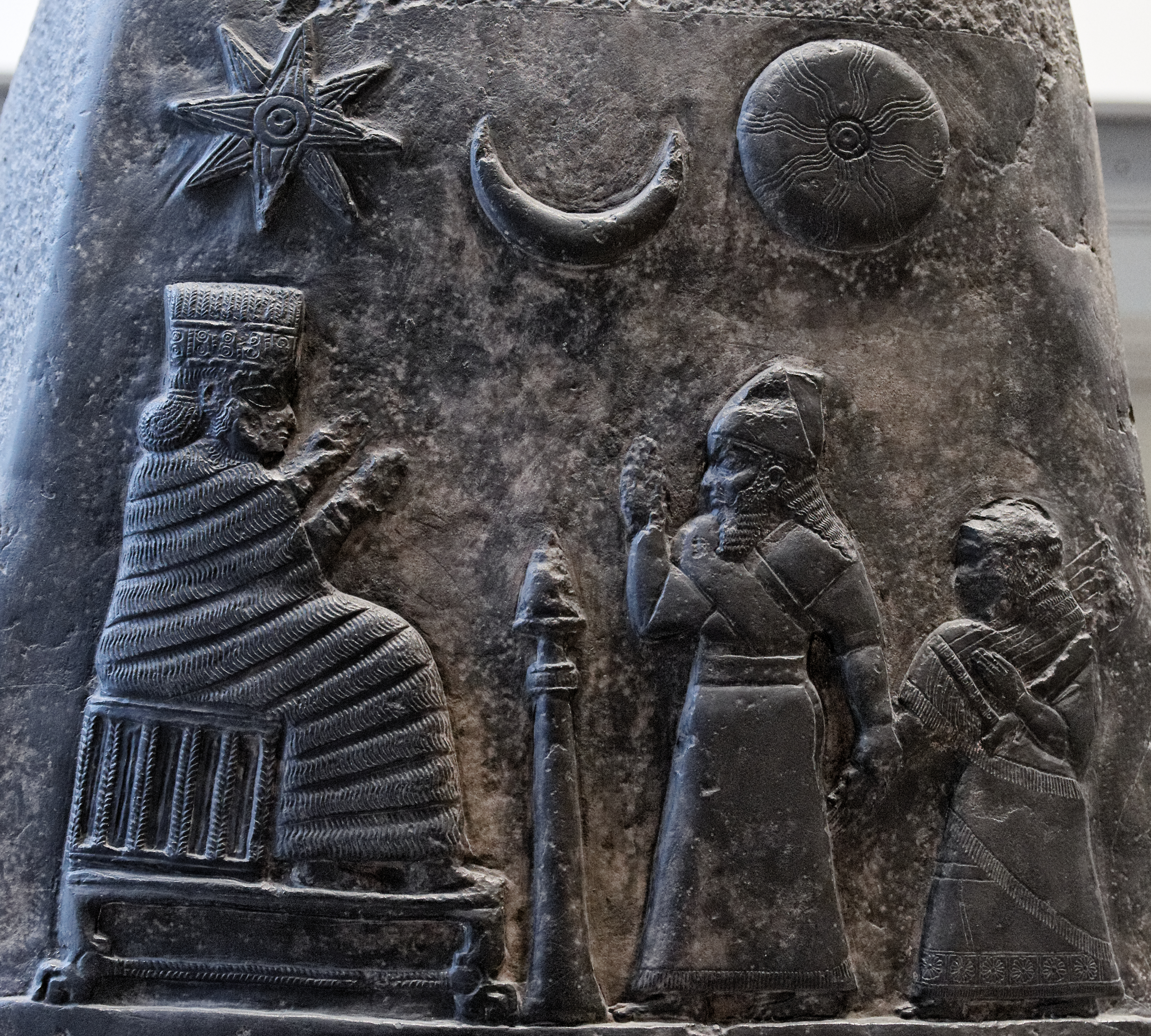
The Star of Ishtar (Venus), the crescent Moon and the Sun in Land Grant to Hunnubat-Nanaya Kudurru. Susa, Babylonia. (ca. 1186-1172 BC), limestone, 83 cm (32.6 in) x 42 cm (16.5 in) x 33 cm (12.9 in), Louvre.

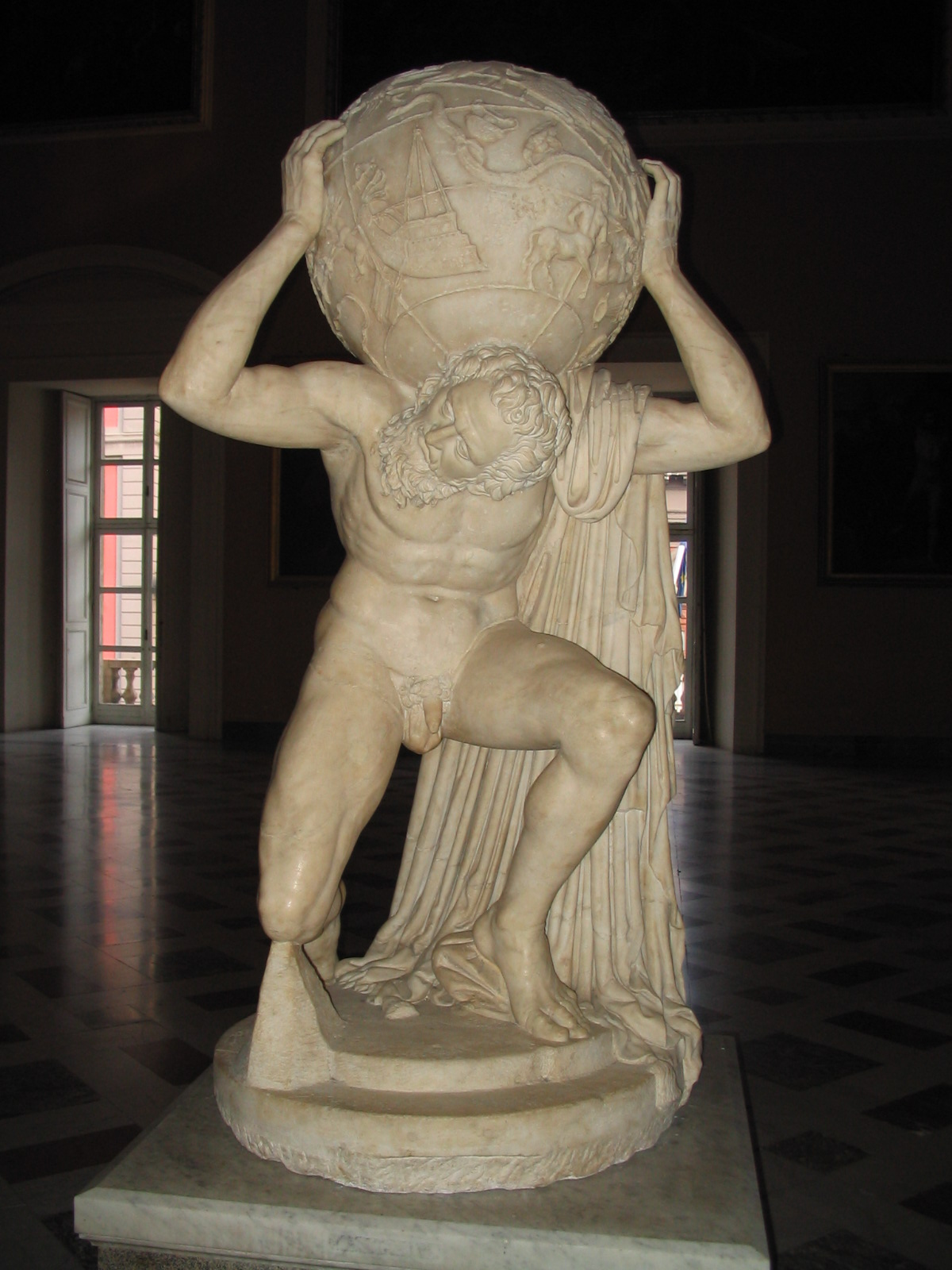
Farnese Atlas (Museo Archeologico Nazionale, Naples), the oldest still existing celestial globe.

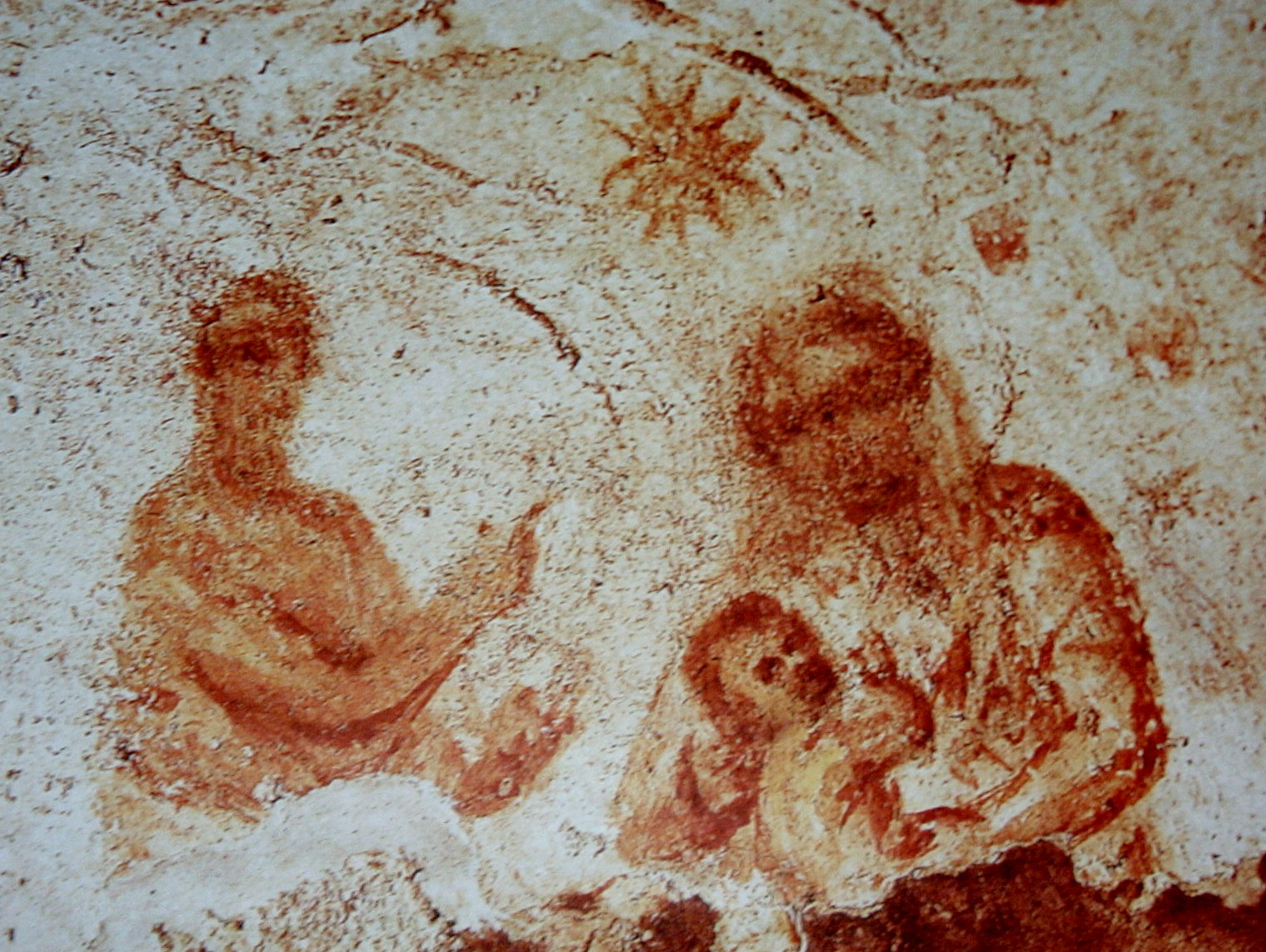
Catacomb of Priscilla depiction of the Star of Bethlehem

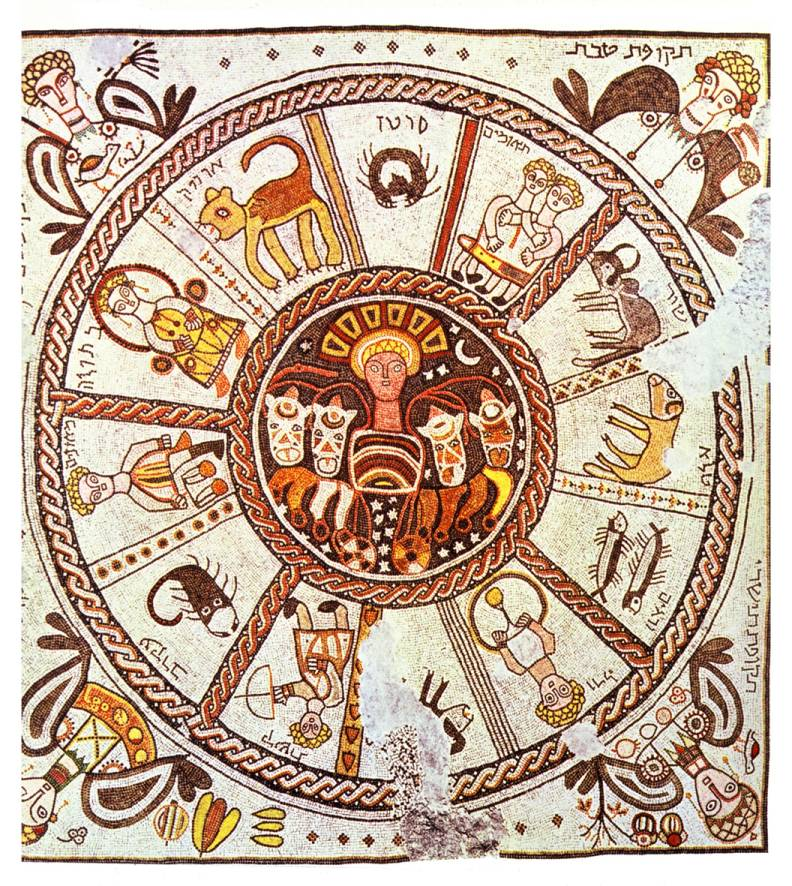
A zodiac from a 6th-century mosaic at a synagogue in Beit Alpha, Israel

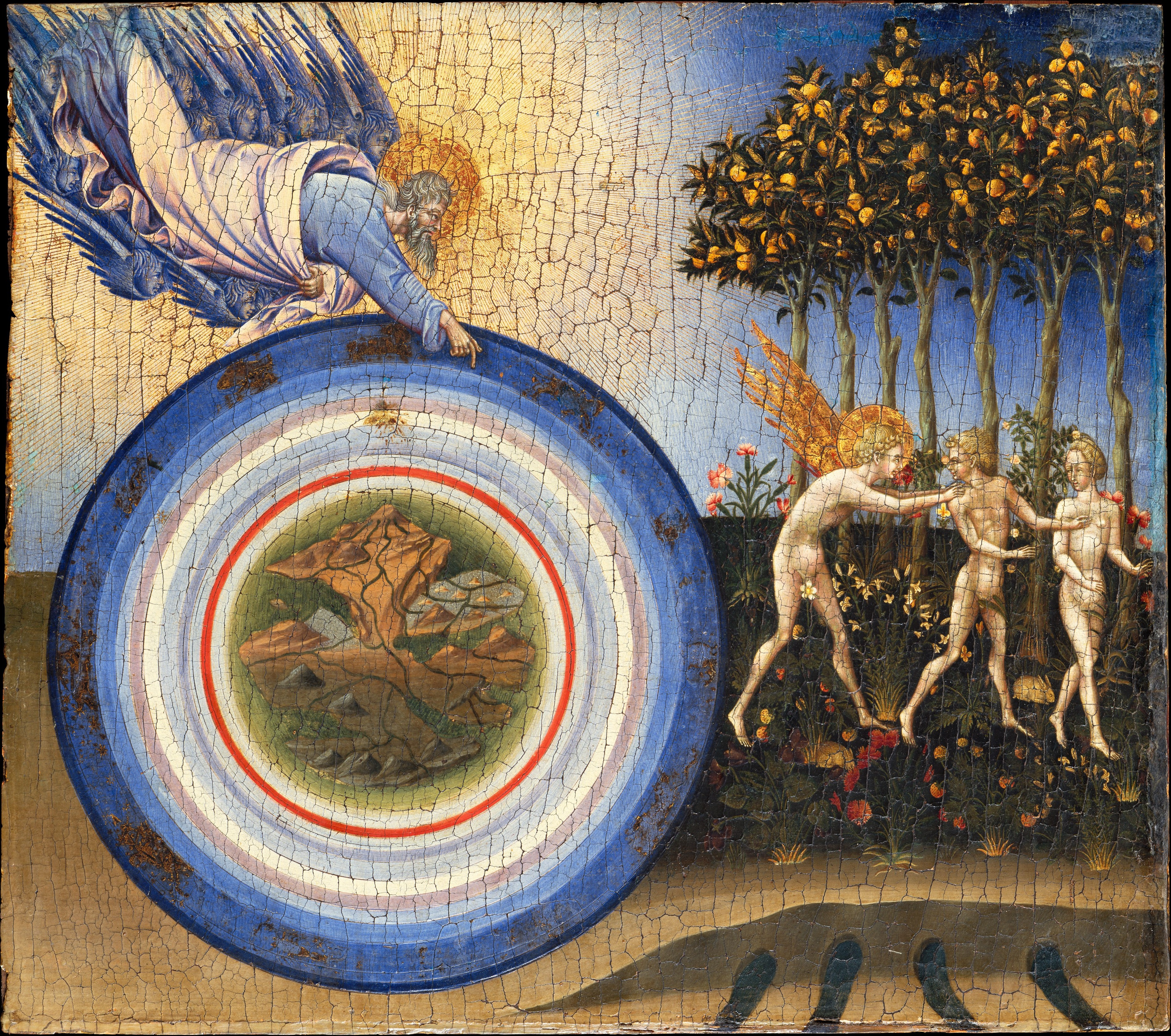
Giovanni di Paolo, The Creation and the Expulsion from the Paradise (ca. 1438–44) Tempera & gold on wood (46.5 x 52 cm ) Metropolitan Museum of Art.

==== Early modern ====
Albrecht Altdorfer's painting The Battle of Issus (1529) shows the curvature of the Earth from a great height. Galileo's sketches of the Moon from the Sidereus Nuncius (1610) were published among other early descriptions of the Moon's topography. In 1711, Donato Creti painted a series of astronomers viewing other planets of the Solar System through a telescope to interest the Vatican in establishing an astronomical observatory.

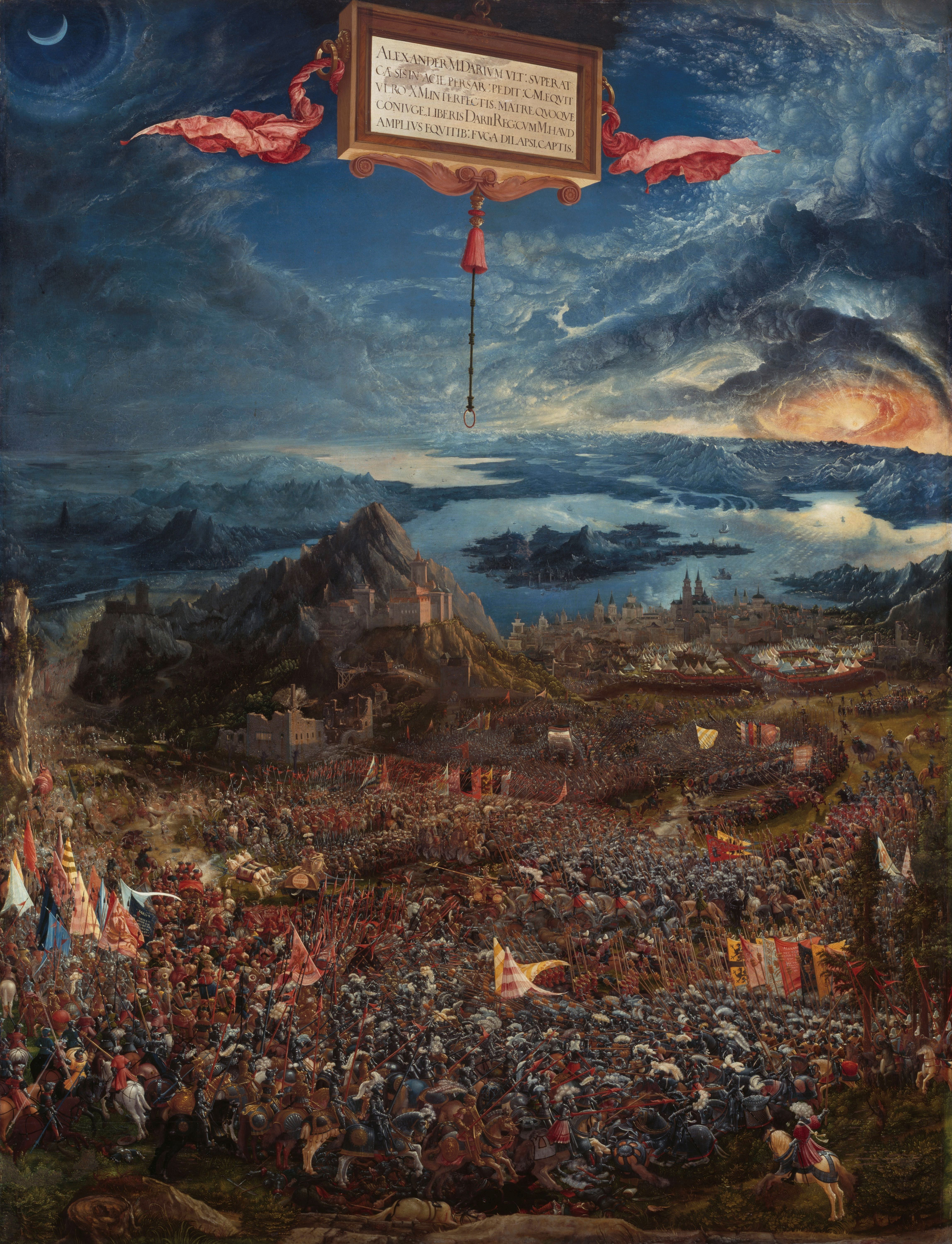
Albrecht Altdorfer, Schlacht bei Issus, Alte Pinakothek

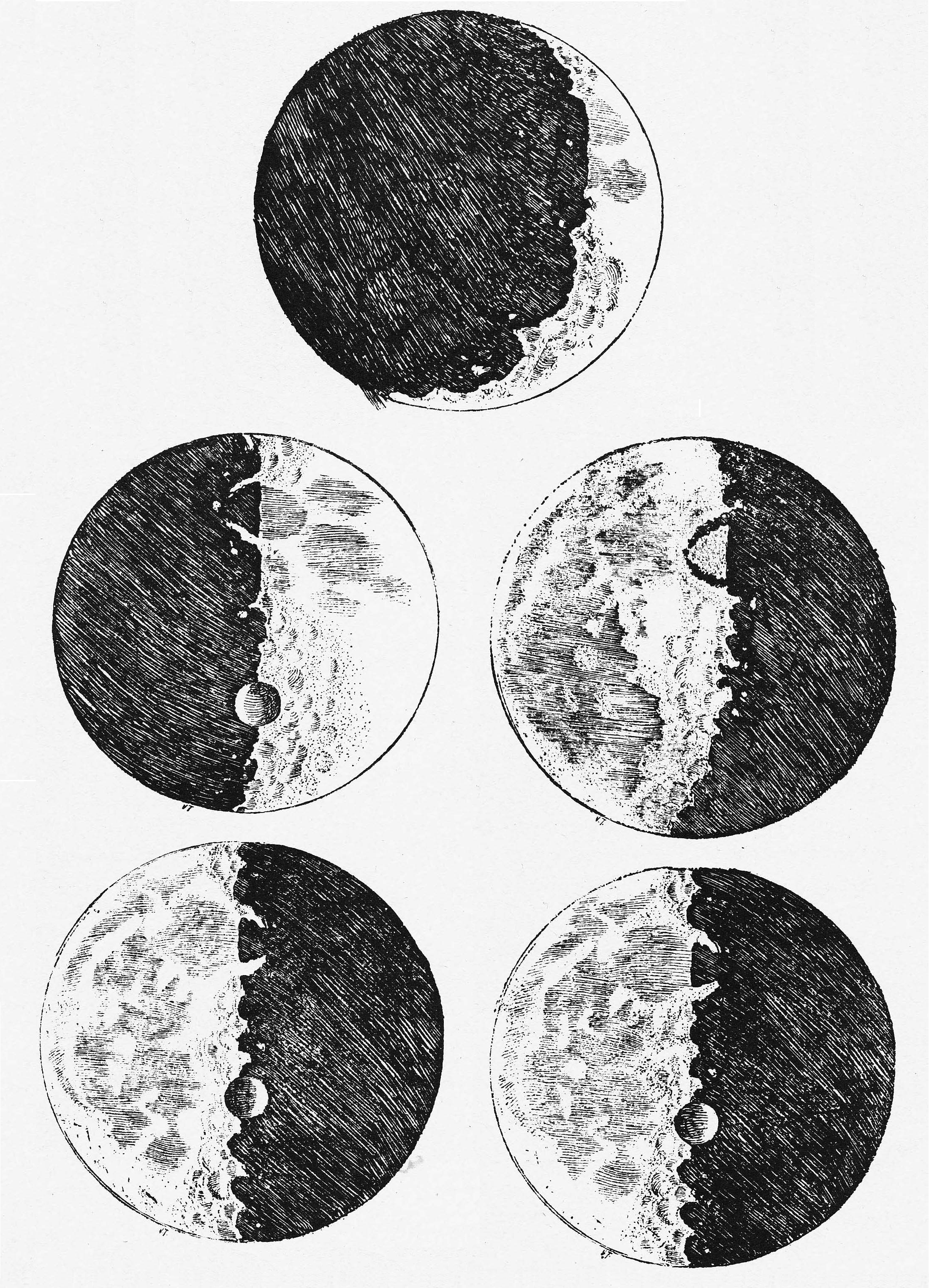
The first published sketches of one of the first telescopic observations of the Moon, from the paper Sidereus Nuncius (1610) by Galileo Galilei, providing among other findings the first descriptions of the Moon's topography

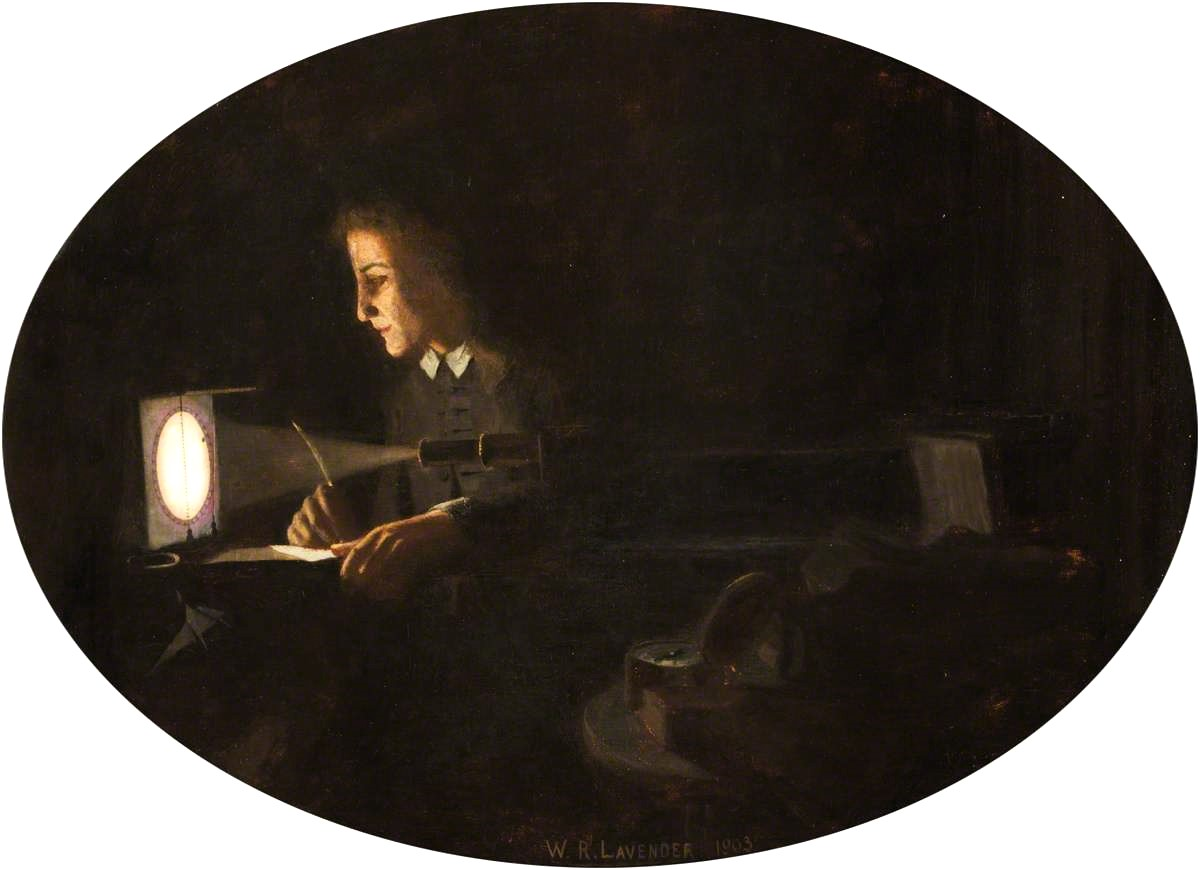
Twentieth century painting of Jeremiah Horrocks observing the 1639 transit of Venus.

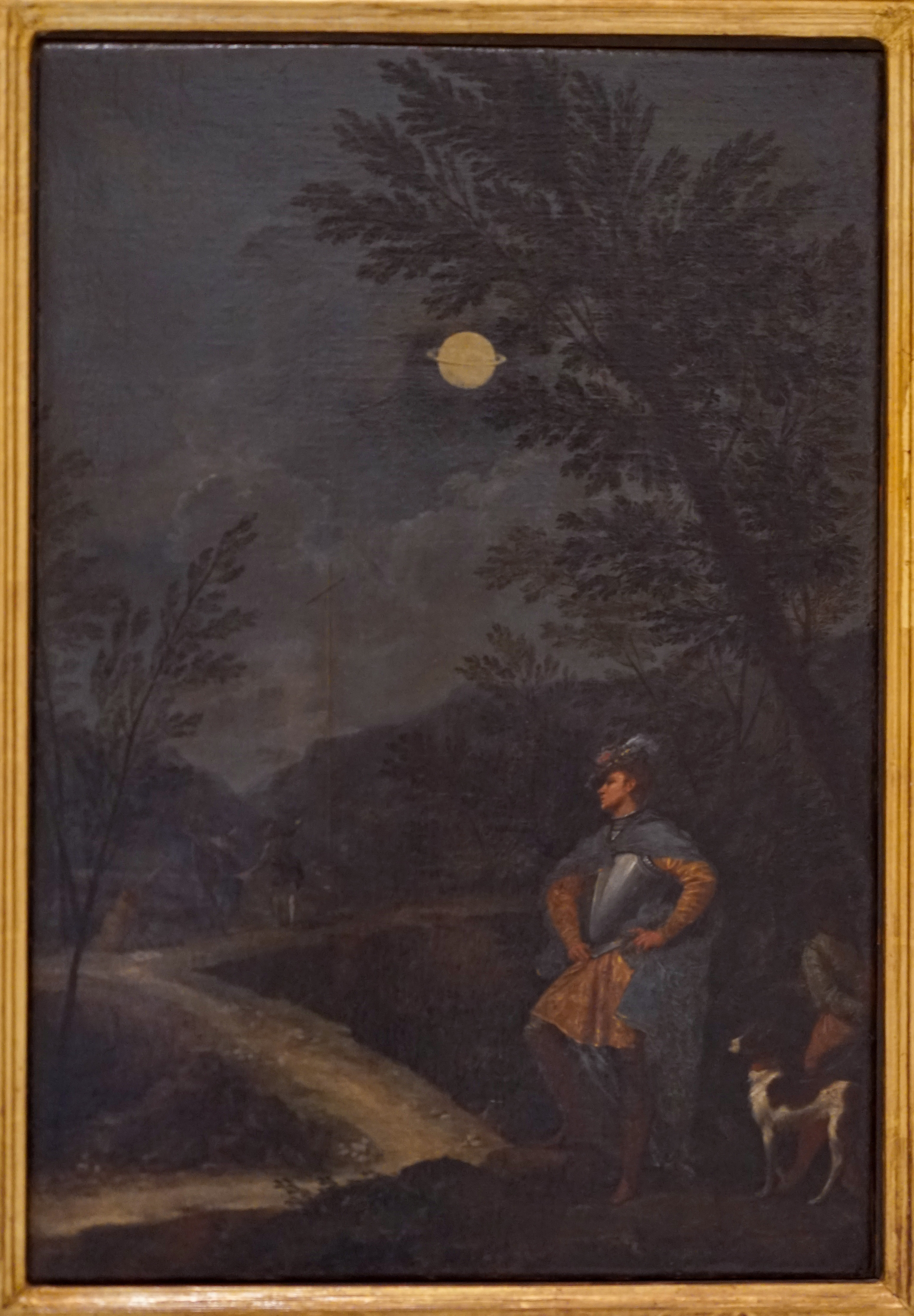
Donato Creti, Astronomical Observations - 07 - Saturn (1771) Oil on canvas (51 cm x 35 cm) Pinacoteca Vaticani.

==== 19th century ====
In the early 1870s-1900s, Étienne Léopold Trouvelot published a series of Chromolithographs of his pastels of astronomical subjects.

In 1874, James Carpenter and James Nasmyth's work The Moon: Considered as a Planet, a World, and a Satellite included photographs of sculpted models of Lunar features, in the marked vertical exaggeration of the actual relief of the Moon.

In 1877, Paul Dominique Philippoteaux and engraver Laplante illustrated Jules Verne's story Off on a Comet, including an imaginative view looking up at the rings of Saturn from the planet itself.

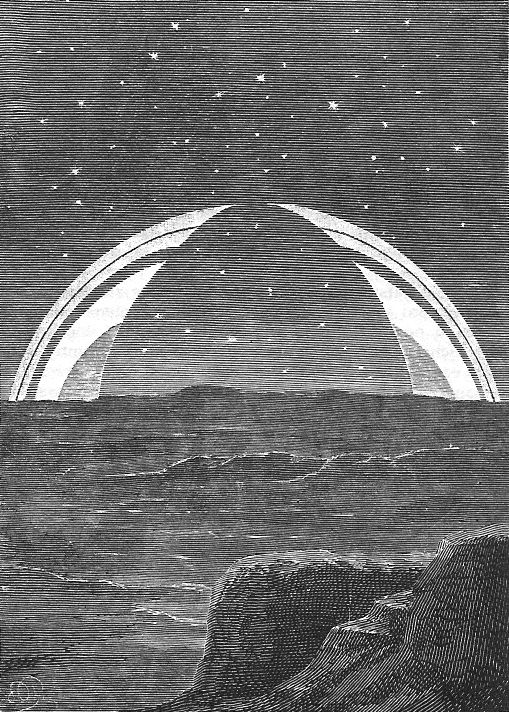
Paul Philippoteaux, illustration from Off on a Comet (1877)

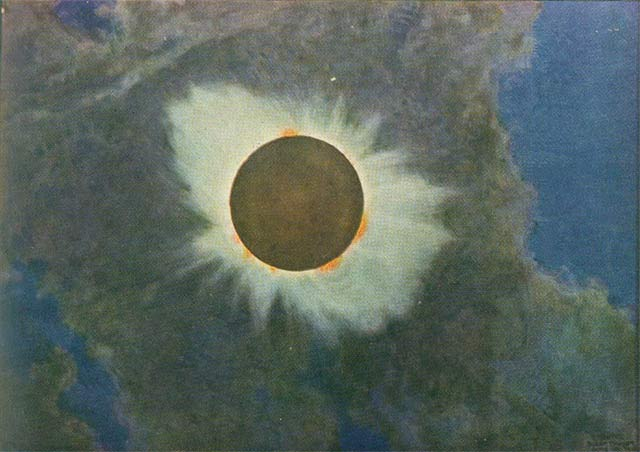
Howard Russell Butler. Eclipse.

The Moon is prominently featured in Vincent van Gogh's 1889 painting The Starry Night.

==== 20th century ====
In 1918, Howard Russell Butler deliberately made use of the dynamic range of human vision in painting a total eclipse based on direct observation.

The New Planet painting (1921) by Konstantin Yuon is an early example for Soviet space art, influenced by cosmism, which fueled and flourished during the Soviet Union's spaceflight advances.

In 1927, Scriven Bolten created lunar landscape images for the Illustrated London News using painted photos of plaster models.

In 1937, Lucien Rudaux painted many works for Sur Les Autres Mondes.

In 1944, Chesley Bonestell's paintings of Saturn seen from its different moons appeared in Life magazine, introducing astronomical art to a wide American audience. Books featuring Bonestell's art include The Conquest Of Space (1949), The Exploration Of Mars (1956), and Life's The World We Live In (1955).

The second Hayden Planetarium Symposium on Space Travel, held in New York in October 1952, resulted in a series of widely read space flight articles in Collier's magazine, illustrated by Bonestell and others.

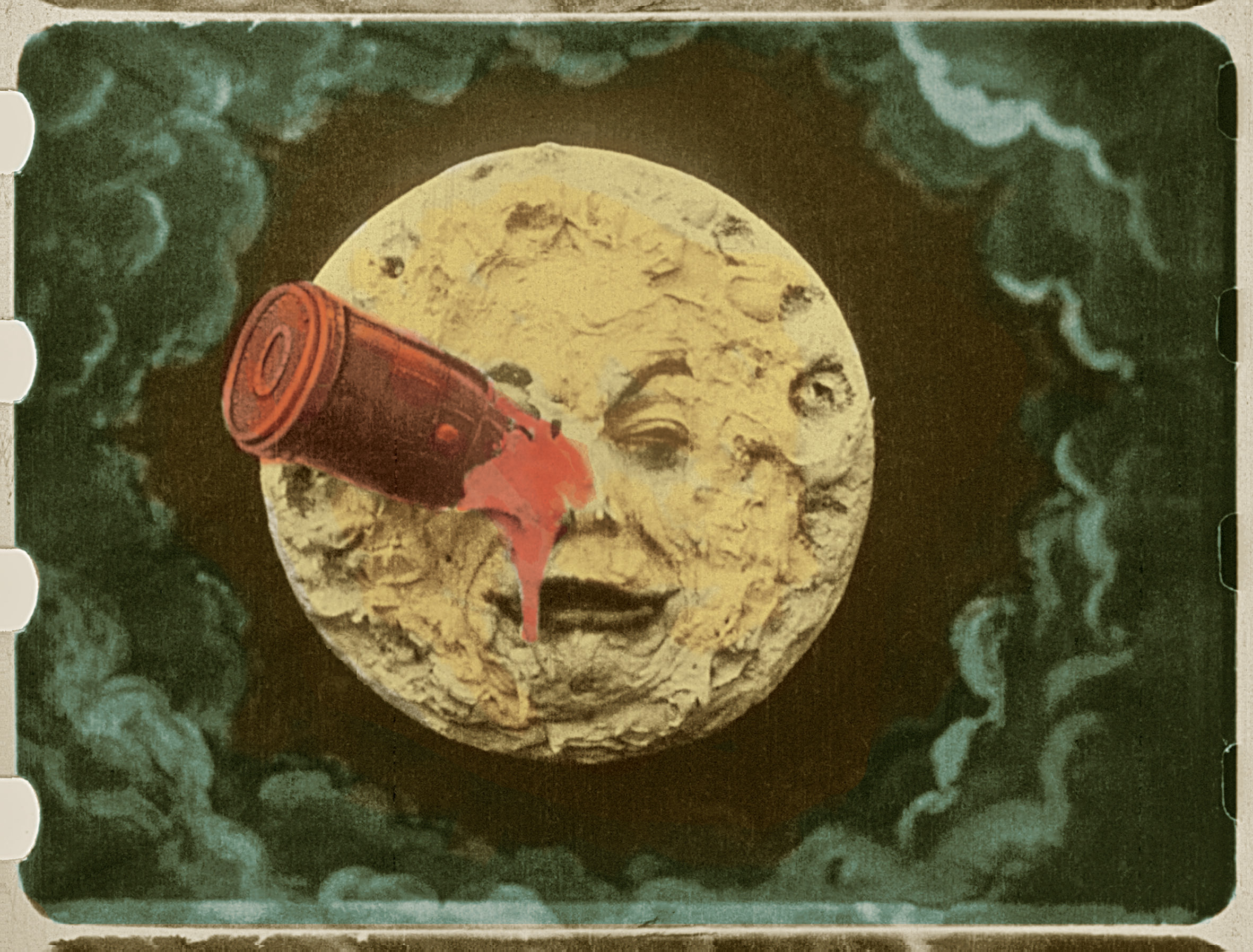
An iconic image of the Man in the Moon from the first science-fiction film set in space, A Trip to the Moon (1902, Georges Méliès), inspired by a history of literature about going to the Moon.

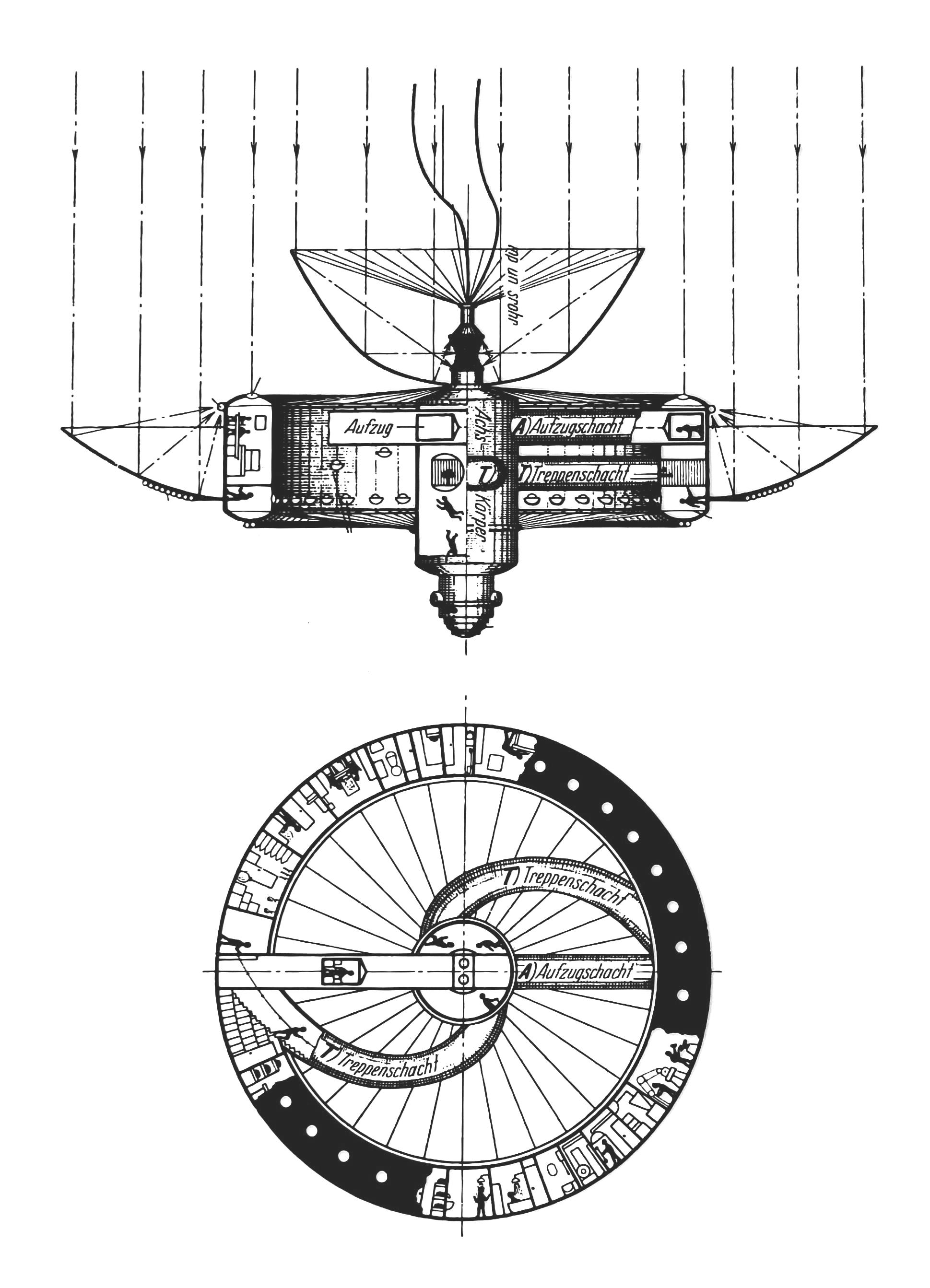
Early scientific space station design and first description of the iconic rotating space station concept, in Hermann Noordung's The Problem of Space Travel (1929).
(Legend: Achs-Körper: axle body. Aufzugschacht: elevator shaft. Treppenschacht: stairwell. Verdampfungsrohr: boiler pipe).

A 1962 map of Mars published by the U.S. Aeronautical Chart and Information Center, showing Martian canals snaking through the Martian landscape. At the time, the existence of the canals was still highly controversial as no close-up pictures of Mars had been taken (until Mariner 4's flyby in 1965).

=== Space age ===
In 1963, Ludek Pesek's paintings filled the large volumes of The Moon And the Planets, and the 1968 volume Our Planet Earth-From The Beginning.

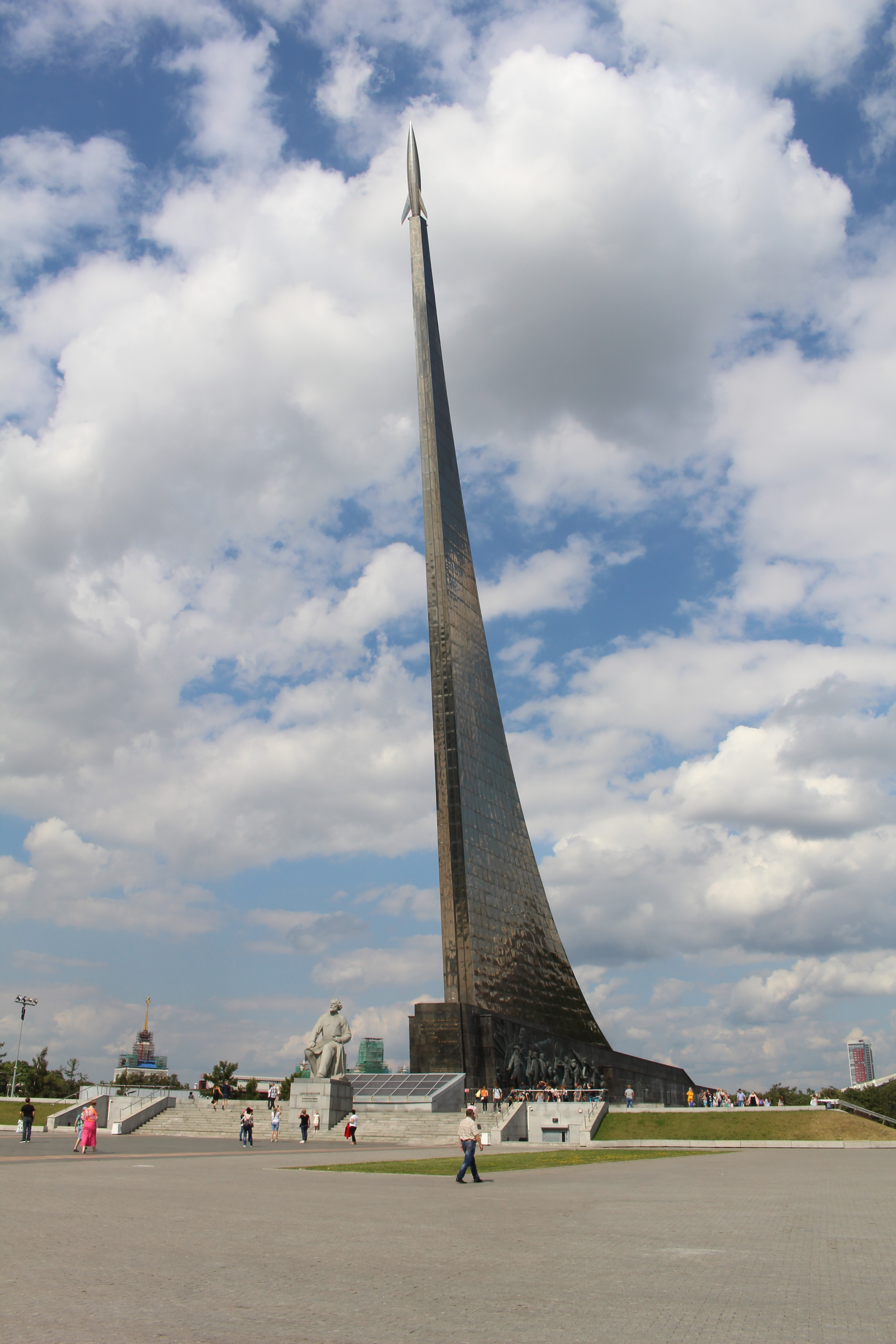
Monument to the Conquerors of Space

The astronaut Alexei Leonov became the first artist in space in 1965, creating the first piece of art in space by drawing a sunrise from orbit around Earth.

The 1980 Cosmos PBS television show and book used the work of many space artists. Host Carl Sagan used such art in several of his books.

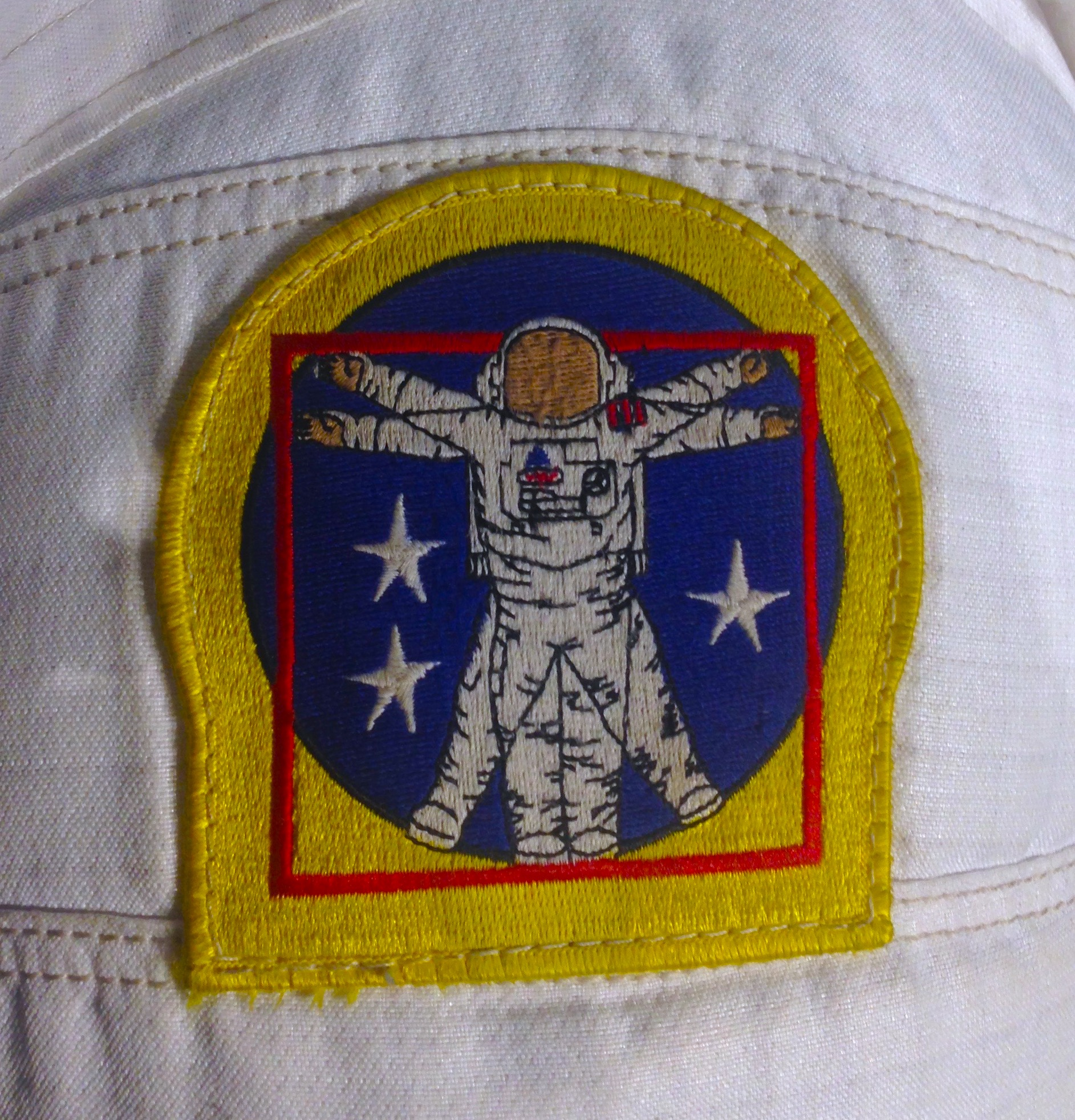
NASA's Extravehicular Mobility Unit Vitruvian Spaceman patch (Space Shuttle version, with three stars representing NASA's human spaceflight programs)

During the 20th century, it became possible for artists to progress from using space as their subject, to using space as a site. The 1986 Eiffel Tower Competition invited artists to design artworks that could be launched into orbit, where they would be visible to the naked eye on Earth. Though these projects were not realised, the competition paved the way for later art satellites such as Trevor Paglen's Orbital Reflector (2018). The launch of inhabited space stations also created new opportunities for artists to engage directly with space, as in Arthur Woods's Cosmic Dancer, a sculpture that was deployed on the Mir Space Station in 1993.

==== 21st century ====
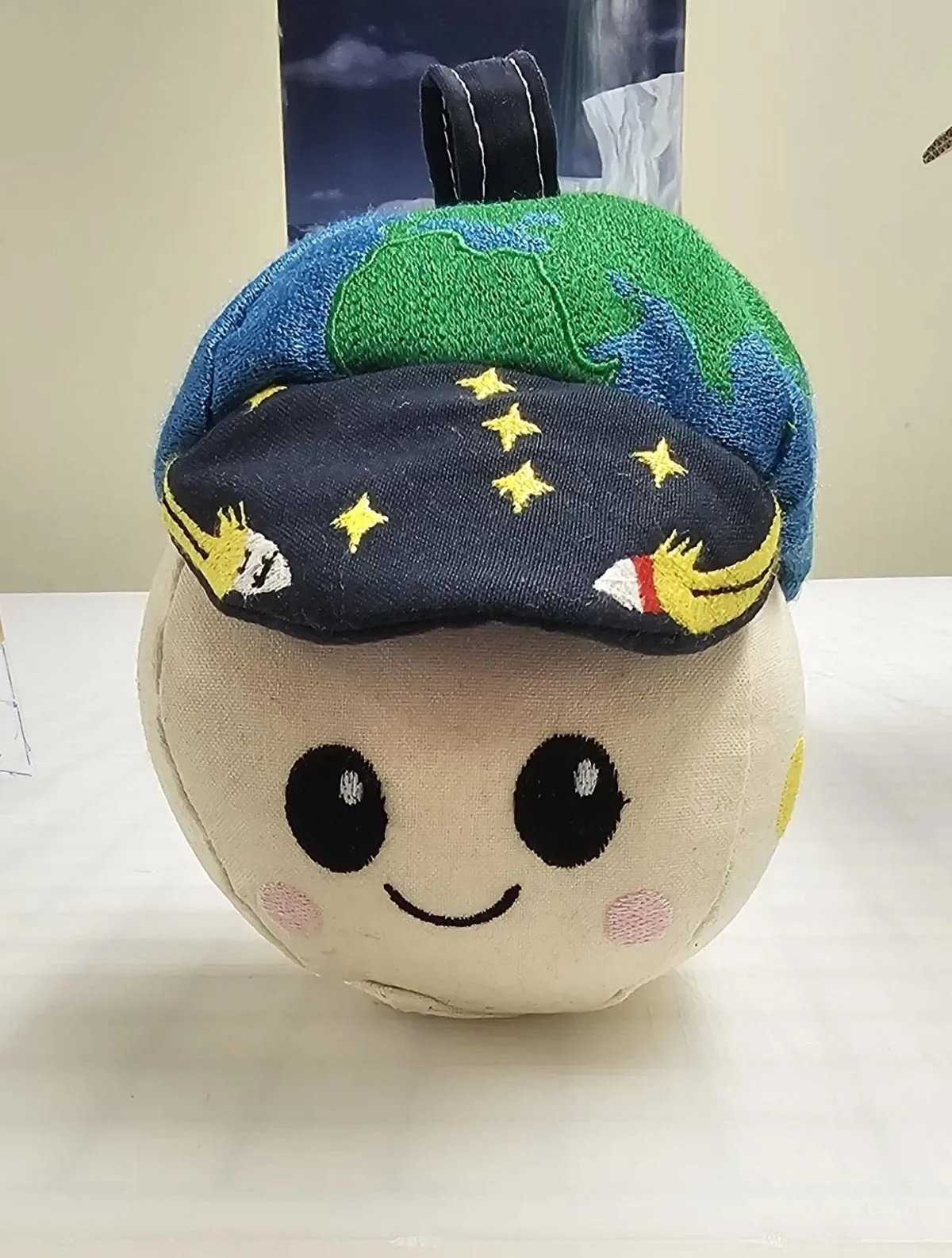
Zero-gravity indicators, like this one of Artemis II called Rise, have become like mission insignia artistic expressions of space missions.

The 21st century expanded to sending art into space.

== Art in space ==
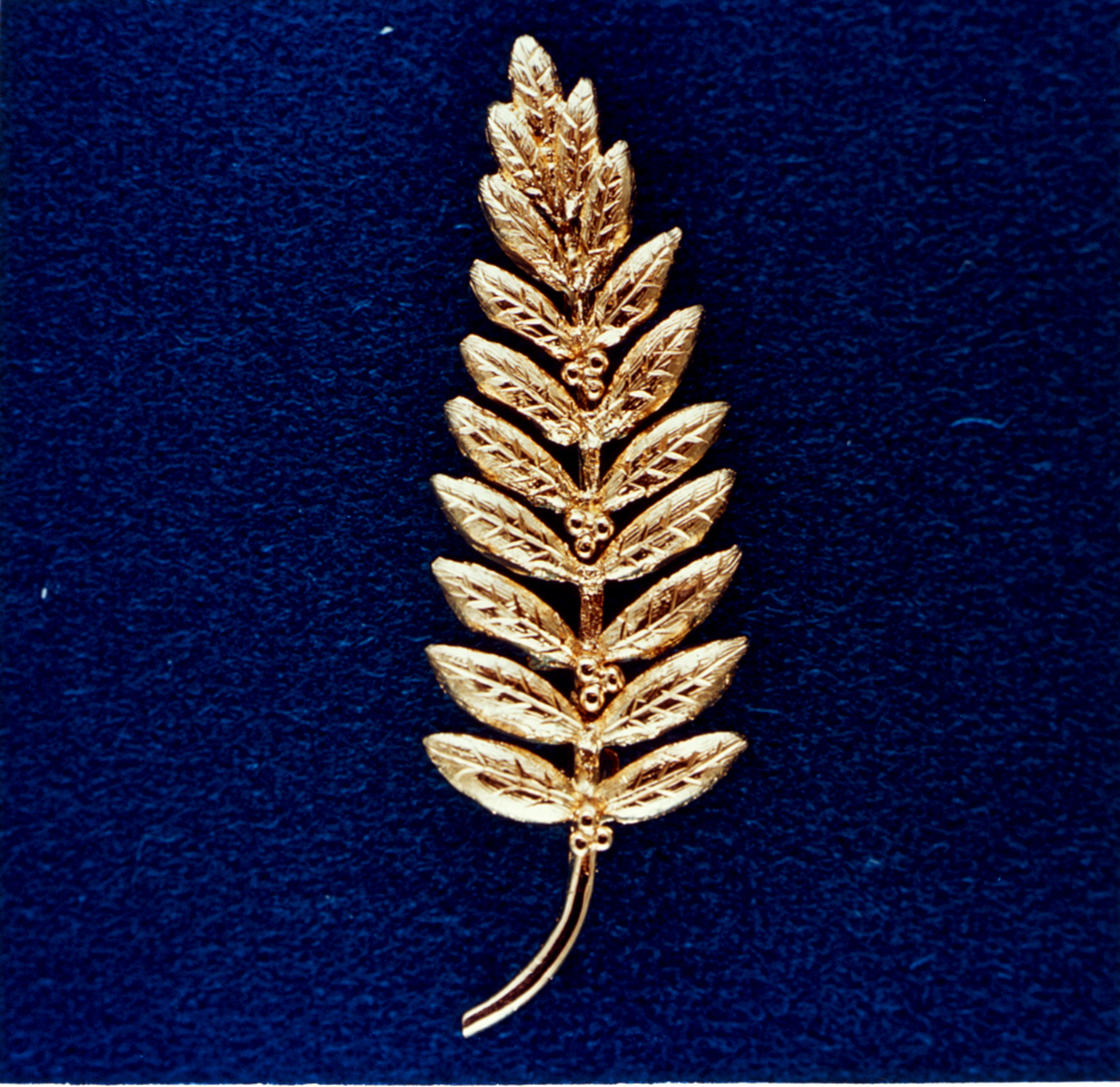
Golden olive branch left on the Moon by Neil Armstrong (Apollo 11) as a symbol of peace.

The first active artist in space was Alexei Leonov, who produced the first drawing in space onboard Voskhod 2 in 1965, depicting an orbital sunrise.

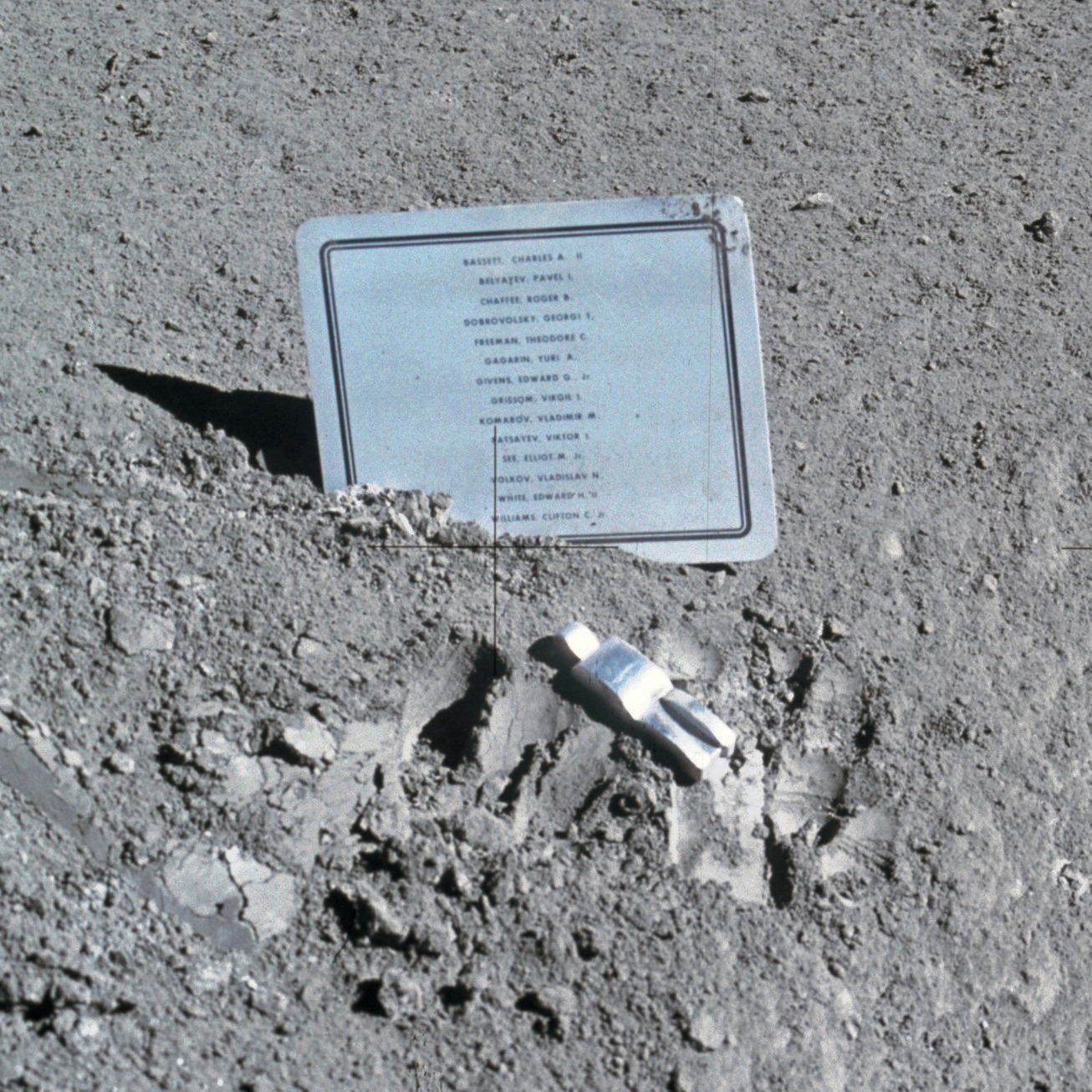
Fallen Astronaut, left on the Moon by David Scott during the Apollo 15 mission

Small art objects have been carried on several Apollo missions, such as gold emblems and a small Fallen Astronaut figurine that was left on the Moon during the 1971 Apollo 15 mission. Visual observations have been recorded in drawings and commentary by earlier cosmonauts and astronauts of difficult-to-photograph phenomena such as the airglow, twilight colors, and outer details of the solar corona.

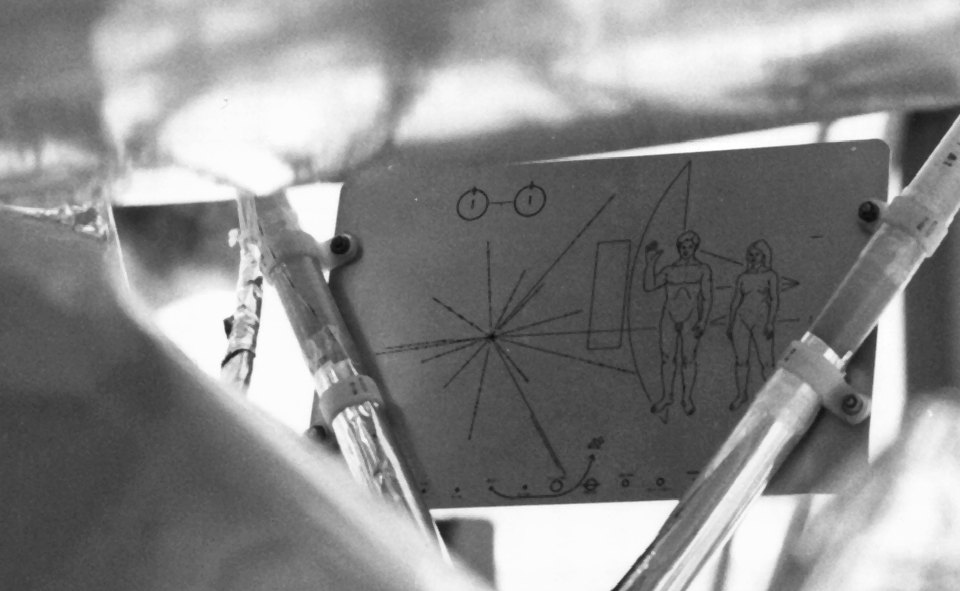
The Pioneer plaque, viewed by some critically for its depiction of humans, mounted on Pioneer 10, the first spacecraft to travel beyond the Inner Solar System, reach escape velocity from the Solar System and the first to leave the planetary system.

Another work, later brought to Earth orbit sometime in the mid-80s, was a study of the golden sunlight on a Soviet space station by Russian artist Andrei Sokolov, carried aboard the Soviet Mir space station starting with modules in February 1986. In 1984, Joseph McShane and Lowry Burgess had their conceptual artwork flown aboard the Space Shuttle utilizing NASA's 'Get Away Special' program.

An art conservation experiment from Vertical Horizons, founded by Howard Wishnow and Ellery Kurtz, was flown aboard the Space Shuttle Columbia STS-61-C on January 12, 1986. Four original oil paintings by American artist Ellery Kurtz were flown in one of NASA's GetAway Special (G.A.S.) containers mounted to a bridge in the shuttle cargo bay. These original works of art are the first oil paintings to enter Earth's orbit. This NASA GAS canister, designated G-481, was the 46th such canister flown aboard a Space Shuttle. The Space Shuttle Columbia orbited the Earth 98 times during its mission duration of 6 days, 2 hours, 3 minutes, and 51 seconds. Columbia was launched from Kennedy Space Center, Cape Canaveral, Florida, on January 12, 1986, and landed at the Kennedy Space Center on January 18, 1986.

The first sculpture specifically designed for human habitat in orbit was Arthur Woods' Cosmic Dancer which was sent to the Mir station in 1993. In 1995, Arthur Woods organized Ars ad Astra, the first art exhibition in Earth orbit. consisting of 20 original artworks from 20 artists and an electronic archive also took place on the Mir space station as part of ESA's EUROMIR'95 mission. In 1998, Frank Pietronigro flew Research Project Number 33: Investigating the Creative Process in a Micro-gravity Environment, where he created 'drift paintings' and danced in microgravity space. In 2006, the artist returned to micro-gravity flight to create three new works, one in collaboration with Lowry Burgess; Moments in the Infinite Absolute, Flags in Space!, and a new form of microgravity mobile.

The Slovenian theater director Dragan Živadinov staged a performance called Noordung Zero Gravity Biomechanical during a parabolic flight organized through the Yuri Gagarin Cosmonaut Training Center facility in Star City in 1999. The UK arts group The Arts Catalyst, with the MIR consortium (Arts Catalyst, Projekt Atol, V2 Organisation, Leonardo-Olats), organized a series of parabolic 'zero gravity' flights for artistic and cultural experimentation with the Gagarin Cosmonaut Training Centre, as well as with the European Space Agency, between 2000 and 2004, including Investigations in Microgravity, MIR Flight 001, and MIR Campaign 2003. Artists who participated in these flights and visits to Russia and ESA have included the Otolith Group, shortlisted in 2011 for the Turner Prize, Stefan Gec, Ansuman Biswas and Jem Finer, Kitsou Dubois, Yuri Leiderman, and Marcel·li Antunez Roca.

Richard Garriott visited the International Space Station, via the Soyuz TMA-13 on October 12, 2008, where he displayed an art exhibition, Celestial Matters, during his 12 days in orbit. Celestial Matters included works by ten American artists as well as work Garriott created himself while in orbit, honoring his heritage in art and science. The art was later exhibited at the Charles Bank Gallery in New York City in October 2011. Garriott also exhibited Astrogeneris Mementos, two small works, somewhat reminiscent of memento mori or hairwork, containing locks of hair from Richard Garriott and Owen Garriott sealed in chambers by Steve Brudniak, the first assemblage sculptures exhibited in outer space.

In 2009, NASA astronaut Nicole Stott having brought watercolor paint and watercolor paper with her for the long-duration Expedition 21 mission to the International Space Station became the first astronaut to paint in space.

The Mexican artist and musician Nahum directed the art and science project Matters of Gravity (La Gravedad de los Asuntos in Spanish), a project reflecting on gravity in its absence. The first mission consisting only of Latin American artists was executed in a zero-gravity flight at the Yuri Gagarin Cosmonaut Training Center in 2014. The participating artists include Tania Candiani, Ale de la Puente, Ivan Puig, Arcángelo Constantini, Fabiola Torres-Alzaga, Gilberto Esparza, Juan Jose Diaz Infante, Nahum, and Marcela Armas. The project included the participation of Mexican scientist Miguel Alcubierre and curators Rob La Frenais and Kerry Anne Doyle.

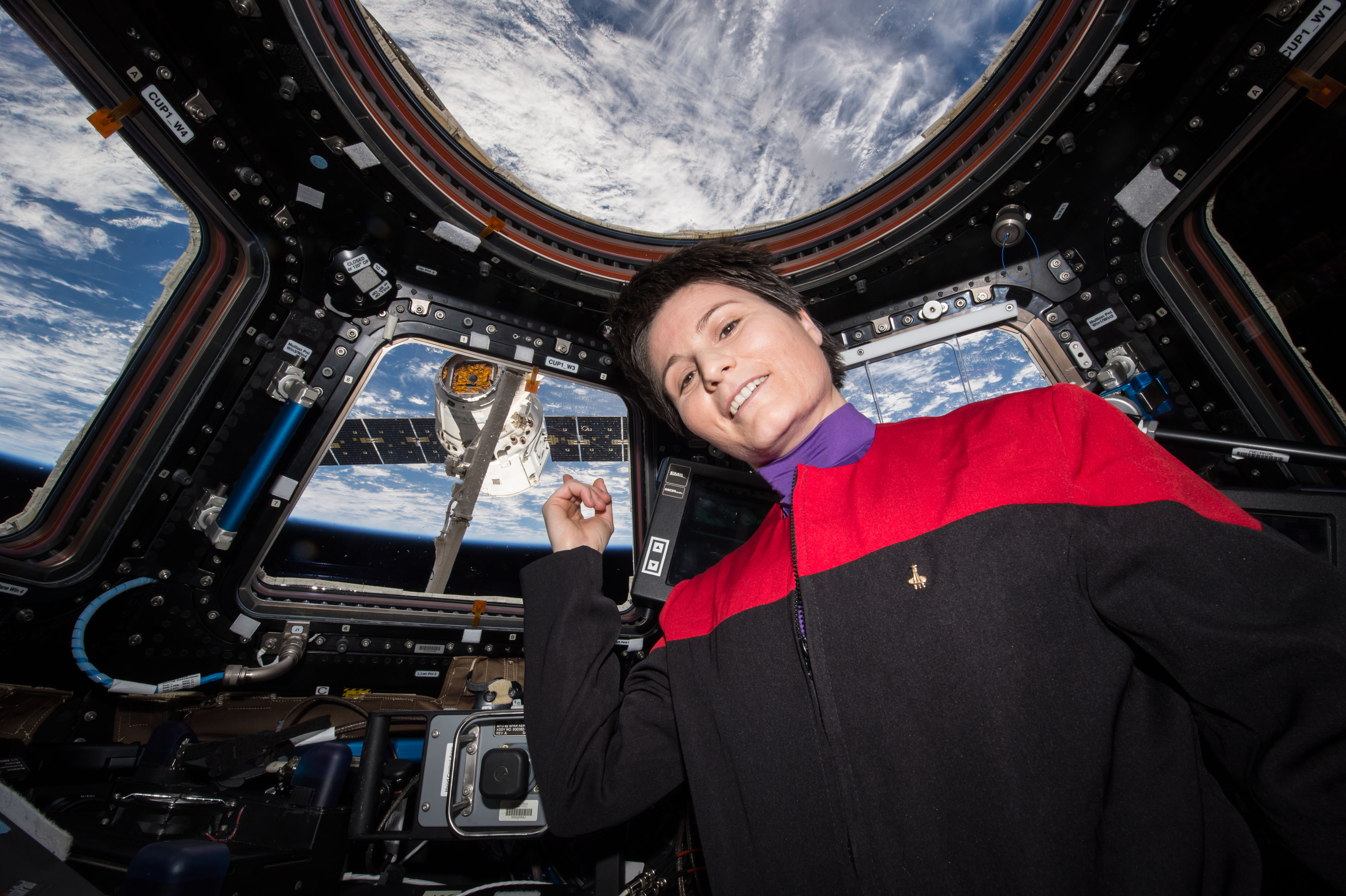
Samantha Cristoforetti in Star Trek uniform inside of the ISS Cupola with a view of SpaceX CRS-6

Performance art has also occurred in space, as with Chris Hadfield's 2013, edited performance of David Bowie's 1969 song "Space Oddity" and Thomas Pesquet's 2017 edited performance of "L'Art de la joie par les Spacelatorz".

=== Sojourner 2020 project onboard the International Space Station ===
In the Sojourner 2020 project from MIT, the Space Exploration Initiative took nine selected artists to develop art projects on board the International Space Station. Sojourner 2020 was designed and built by the initiative's arts curator Xin Liu. The payload was a 1.5U size device (100mm x 100mm x 152.4mm) that was launched into low Earth orbit between March 7 and April 7 during the COVID-19 pandemic. It featured a three-layer telescoping structure that simulated three different "gravities": zero gravity, lunar gravity, and Martian gravity. Each layer of the structure rotated independently. The top layer remained still in weightlessness, while the middle and bottom layers spun at different speeds to produce centripetal accelerations that mimicked lunar gravity and Martian gravity respectively. Each layer carried six pockets that held the projects. Each pocket was a container with a diameter of 10 mm and a depth of 12 mm. The artist proposed and accomplished artworks in a variety of different mediums, including carved stone sculptures by Erin Genia, liquid pigment experiments by Andrea Ling and Levi Cai, sculptures made of transgender hormone replacement medicines by Adriana Knouf, and living organisms, like marine diatoms of the genus Phaeodactylum Tricornutum, by Luis Guzmán.

The nine artist groups selected onboard Sojourner 2020 were:

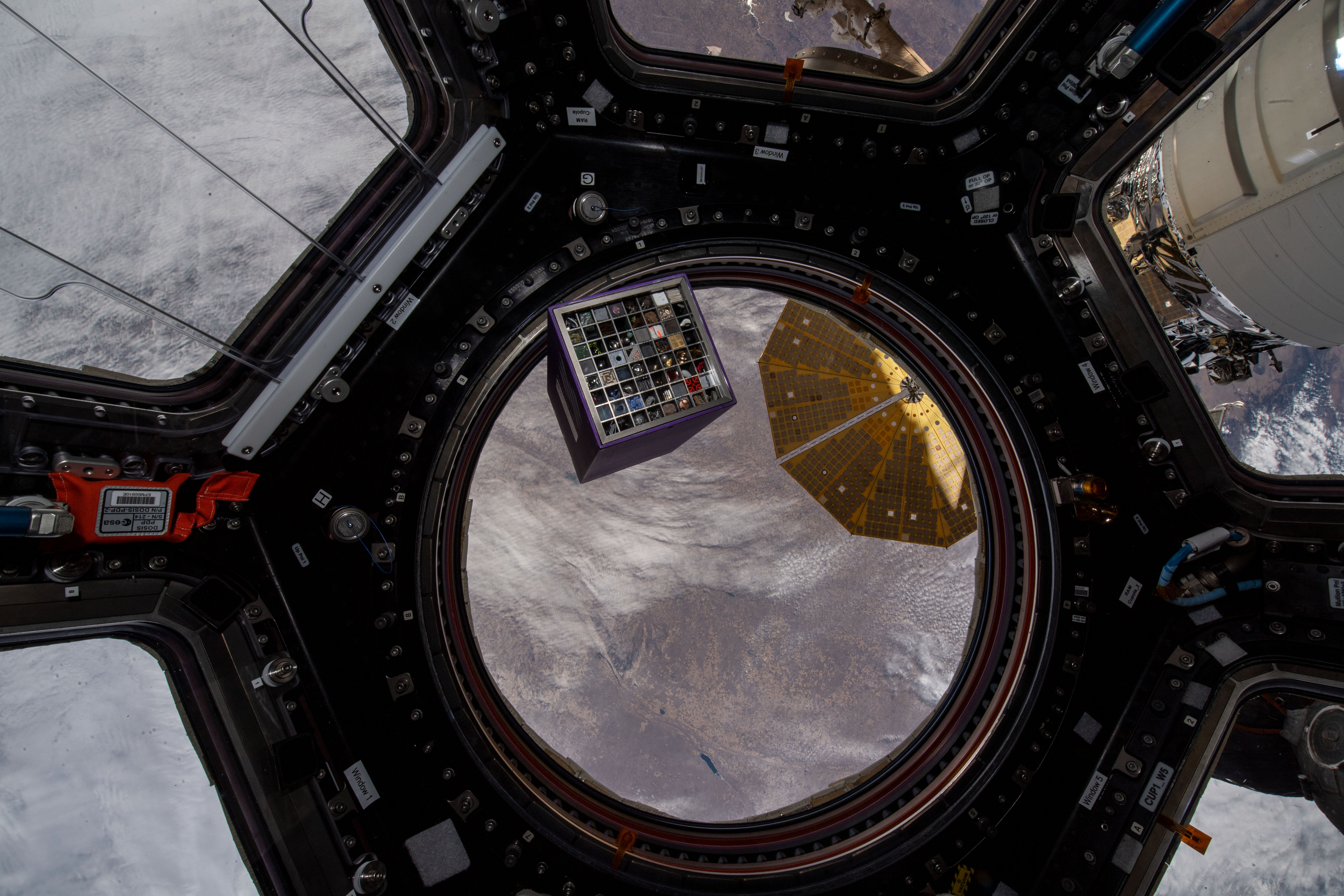
Moon Gallery viewed from the ISS Cupola

- Adriana Knouf - TX-1 - USA
- Erin Genia - Canupa Inyan: Falling Star Woman - American Sisseton Wahpeton Oyate
- Henry Tan - Pearl of Lunar - Thai
- Janet Biggs - Finding Equilibrium - USA
- Kat Kohl - Memory Chain: A Pas de Deux of Artifact - USA
- Levi Cai & Andrea Ling - Abiogenetic Triptych - USA, Canada
- Luis Bernardo Guzmán - bio architectures (Cosmo biology) - Chile
- Masahito Ono - Nothing, Something, Everything - Japan
- Xin Liu, Lucia Monge - Unearthing the Futures - China and Peru

=== Artworks launched into outer space ===
- The Golden Record: Greetings and Sounds of the Earth
- The Contour of Presence by Nahum
- Orbital Reflector by Trevor Paglen
- Enoch by Tavares Strachan
- Moon Gallery by the Moon Gallery Foundation
- Echoes From the Valley of Existence by Amy Karle
- In Praise of Mystery by Ada Limon

Humans have engaged in many cultural activities in space, particularly on space stations, recontextualizing terrestrial culture and art, and exploring how art processes, tools and techniques can be adapted to the environment of space.,

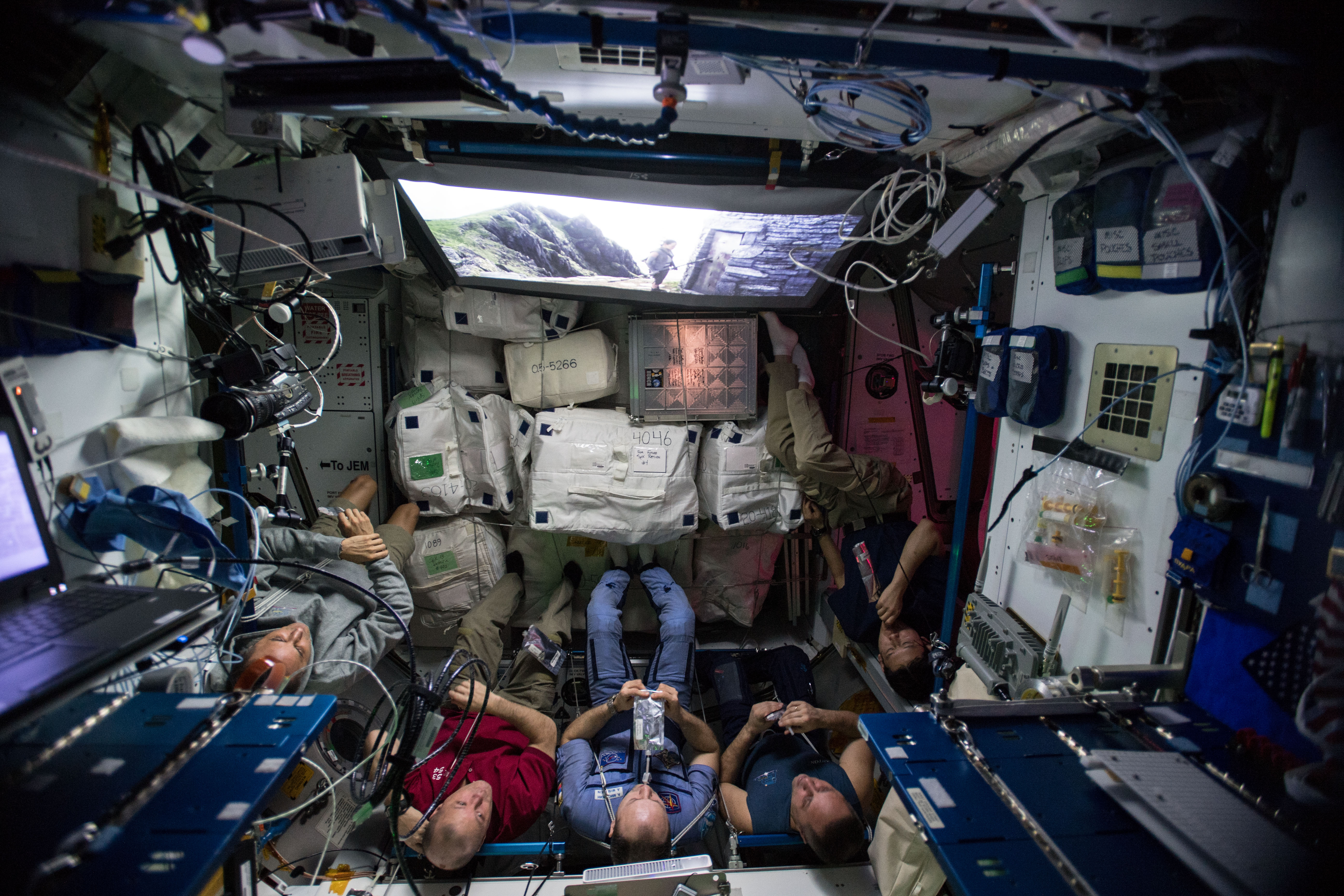
ISS crew watching a movie in orbit, usually Saturdays. Hundreds of movies are stored and have been watched on the ISS.

== Organizations ==
The International Association of Astronomical Artists (IAAA), founded in 1982 by Kim Poor, promotes space-themed visual art.

== See also ==
- Futurism
- Artist's impression
- List of space artists
- List of space art-related books
- Russian cosmism
- Science-fiction
- Space advocacy
- Time capsule
