= Cosmic Dancer (disambiguation) =

Cosmic Dancer may refer to:

- "Cosmic Dancer", song by British rock band T. Rex (band) from their 1971 album Electric Warrior
- Cosmic Dancer (sculpture), flown 1993–2001 aboard space station Mir, created by American-Swiss artist Arthur Woods
- Cosmic Dancer, a 2011 compilation album by British pop-rock project Shakespears Sister
