= Frank Pietronigro =

American artist

Frank Pietronigro is an American interdisciplinary artist, educator and author. He was the first artist to create "drift paintings", where his body floated within a three-dimensional painting that he created in zero gravity aboard NASA's KC135 aircraft. He is a former Associate Fellow at the Frank-Ratchye STUDIO for Creative Inquiry at the Carnegie Mellon College of Fine Arts.

== Education ==
Pietronigro studied at the University of the Arts in Philadelphia, the Multimedia Studies Program, San Francisco State University, and he received his Bachelor of Fine Arts in Interdisciplinary Arts, from the San Francisco Art Institute in 1996.

== Career ==
=== "Drift painting" project ===
On April 4, 1998, Pietronigro flew from NASA's Johnson Space Center, aboard a KC135 turbojet, to create ‘drift paintings’ as the artist's body floated within the 3-D kinetic painting space facilitated by parabolic flight and microgravity. He appropriated modernist painting conventions using similar techniques employed in abstract expressionism but with the intention of having different outcomes within a postmodern situation. Pietronigro painted by squeezing rainbow colored acrylic paints from pastry bags into the space surrounding his body. A 75-inch-high (1,900 mm) by 48-inch-wide (1,200 mm) by 52-inch-deep (1,300 mm) plastic bag was tethered to the interior of the jet using bungee cords and Velcro. This "creativity chamber", as he called it, was to contain the floating paint while allowing for free-float body movement within the space. Before flight Pietronigro filled 10", 14" and 18" pastry bags with acrylic gel medium, at the viscosity of toothpaste, and then he used these tools to project the paint into the space surrounding his body.

=== Other projects ===
Pietronigro is co-founder and project director of the Zero Gravity Arts Consortium (ZGAC) in the United States. He co-founded the organization in 1999 with Laura Knott and Lorelei Lisowsky. The group is an international space arts organization that aims to fostering greater access for artists to space flight technology and zero gravity space through the creation of international partnerships with space agencies, space industry entrepreneurs, arts and science organizations and leading universities. It is the first organization of its kind, facilitating parabolic flight projects that the group hopes will help teams of artists to have permanent access to space transportation systems including the International Space Station.

Pietronigro is one of the coordinators for "Yuri’s Night" Bay Area 2007/08 held at NASA Ames Research Center. "Yuri's Night" is a series of parties in various countries that celebrate the anniversary of Yuri Gagarin's first crewed space flight in 1961. Pietronigro leads a Yuri's Night Bay Area event at NASA Ames Research Center on the tarmac and surrounding aircraft hangars.

In 2006, he was co-chair of the Space Art Track of the 25th International Space Development Conference, co-sponsored by the National Space Society and the Planetary Society.

== Awards and recognition ==
Pietronigro has been awarded multiple San Francisco Arts Commission Individual Artist Commission Grants; a National Space Grant College and Fellowship Program Award; a Sobel Memorial Scholarship from the San Francisco Art Institute; a Creativity Certificate of Distinction from Art Direction Magazine; and a Merit Award from the Society of Communicating Arts, during their 32nd Annual Exhibit of Advertising and Design.
