= Hell or High Water (soundtrack) =

Hell or High Water (Original Motion Picture Soundtrack)

Soundtrack album by Nick Cave, Warren Ellis and various artists
- Released: August 12, 2016
- Genre: Country; film score
- Length: 43:29
- Label: Milan
- Producer: Nick Cave; Warren Ellis

Nick Cave and Warren Ellis chronology
Far from Men (2015)	Hell or High Water (2016)	War Machine (2017)

Hell or High Water (Original Motion Picture Soundtrack) is the soundtrack to the 2016 film Hell or High Water. The soundtrack featured original score composed by Nick Cave and Warren Ellis, and songs from country musicians. It was released through Milan Records on August 12, 2016.

== Background ==
In May 2016, it was reported that Australian musicians Nick Cave and Warren Ellis would compose music for the film. The duo met the film's director, David Mackenzie at the Retreat Studio in Brighton and played few source materials to the latter who liked it and also demanded the music to be "grainy and with grit". The score in its entirety was completed within ten days; five days for scoring and another five days to refine and string overdubs. Mackenzie recalled that "What I love about Nick and Warren's film music is that it's epic and expansive without being grandiose. For me as a filmmaker this hits a sweet spot where the score is able to have scale and emotion but not feel manipulative or overwhelming."

Besides Cave and Ellis' score, the album featured contributions from Townes Van Zandt, Ray Wylie Hubbard, Waylon Jennings, Colter Wall, Scott H. Biram and Chris Stapleton. The soundtrack was released through Milan Records on August 12, 2016. A music video for the song "Comancheria" was unveiled in late-September 2016.

== Critical reception ==
Adam Fleet of The Guardian described the score as "excellent". David Rooney of The Hollywood Reporter wrote that Cave and Ellis' "somber" score "has often served as an expressive bridge between the Old and New West". Jimi Famurewa of Empire described it as "typically foreboding". David Edelstein of Vulture wrote "The score, by Nick Cave and Warren Ellis, is free-floating in its sadness. It conjures up a mood—gorgeously—not a meaning." Calling it as a "predictably strong element", Charles Gant of Screen Daily called it as "initially plaintive, progressively more throbbing". Eric Kohn of IndieWire wrote "the twangy score by Nick Cave and Warren Ellis keeps the pace moving at a vibrant clip".

== Track listing ==
Hell or High Water (Original Motion Picture Soundtrack) track listing
No.	Title	Artist(s)	Length
1.	"Comancheria"	Nick Cave; Warren Ellis	2:05
2.	"Dollar Bill Blues"	Townes Van Zandt	3:01
3.	"Mama's Room"	Cave; Ellis	2:49
4.	"Dust of the Chase"	Ray Wylie Hubbard	5:05
5.	"Texas Midlands"	Cave; Ellis	2:02
6.	"Robbery"	Cave; Ellis	3:26
7.	"You Ask Me To"	Waylon Jennings	2:29
8.	"Mountain Lion Mean"	Cave; Ellis	2:07
9.	"Sleeping on the Blacktop"	Colter Wall	3:12
10.	"From My Cold Dead Hands"	Cave; Ellis	2:30
11.	"Lord of the Plains"	Cave; Ellis	2:35
12.	"Blood, Sweat and Murder"	Scott H. Biram	2:54
13.	"Casino"	Cave; Ellis	1:50
14.	"Comancheria II"	Cave; Ellis	1:49
15.	"Outlaw State of Mind"	Chris Stapleton	5:35
Total length:			43:29

== Chart performance ==
Chart performance for Hell or High Water (Original Motion Picture Soundtrack)
Chart (2016)	Peak position
Belgian Albums (Ultratop Flanders)	134
Belgian Albums (Ultratop Wallonia)	162
UK Country Artists Albums (OCC)	3
UK Soundtrack Albums (OCC)	12
US Top Soundtracks (Billboard)	18

== Accolades ==
Accolades for Hell or High Water (Original Motion Picture Soundtrack)
Award	Date of ceremony	Category	Recipient(s)	Result	Ref.
Austin Film Critics Association	December 28, 2016	Best Score	Nick Cave and Warren Ellis	Nominated	
San Diego Film Critics Society	December 12, 2016	Best Original Score	Nick Cave and Warren Ellis	Nominated	
San Francisco Film Critics Circle	December 11, 2016	Best Original Score	Nick Cave and Warren Ellis	Nominated	
