= Space in fiction =

Space in fiction can refer to:

- Astronomical locations in fiction
- Hyperspace
- Space elevators in fiction
- Space stations and habitats in fiction
- Space travel in science fiction
- Space warfare in science fiction
- Wormholes in fiction
