= The Proposition (soundtrack) =

Soundtrack album by Nick Cave and Warren Ellis
- Released: 2005
- Recorded: 2005
- Length: 42:23
- Label: Mute
- Producer: Nick Cave, Warren Ellis

Nick Cave and Warren Ellis chronology
The Proposition (2005)	The Assassination of Jesse James by the Coward Robert Ford (2007)

Professional ratings
Review scores
Source	Rating
Allmusic	link
Pitchfork Media	link

The Proposition is a soundtrack recorded by Nick Cave in collaboration with Warren Ellis, and was produced for the film The Proposition, released in October 2005. At the 2005 AFI Awards it won Best Original Music Score for Cave and Ellis.

At the ARIA Music Awards of 2006 the soundtrack was nominated for ARIA Award for Best Original Soundtrack, Cast or Show Album.

== Music style ==
This album is instrumentally focused, and is a departure from Cave's band-oriented compositions. All tracks are directly reproduced from the musical interludes in the film, and feature little alteration from the film score. Many songs on the album are slow-tempo and ballad-like, and the violin work of Warren Ellis becomes the central voice of the album for much of the time. Cave's unusual vocal performances on the "Rider" trilogy of songs brings a particularly haunting and uneasy tone to the album.

== Track listing ==
- Written by Nick Cave and Warren Ellis, except where noted
1. "Happy Land" (trad.) – 1:36
2. "The Proposition #1" – 3:24
3. "Road to Banyon" – 1:40
4. "Down to the Valley" – 3:48
5. "Moan Thing" – 2:46
6. "The Rider #1" – 1:15
7. "Martha's Dream" (Cave, Ellis, Mick Turner, Jim White) – 3:07
8. "Gun Thing" – 4:28
9. "Queenie's Suite" (Cave, Ellis, Turner, White) – 3:30
10. "The Rider #2" – 2:59
11. "The Proposition #2" – 2:42
12. "Sad Violin Thing" – 0:50
13. "The Rider #3" – 1:08
14. "The Proposition #3" – 2:59
15. "The Rider Song" – 2:30
16. "Clean Hands. Dirty Hands" (trad., Cave, Ellis) – 3:34

== Awards ==
- 2005 AFI Awards: Best Original Music Score
- 2005 Inside Film Awards: Best Music
- 2005 Film Critics Circle of Australia Awards: Best Musical Score
