= Orbital sunrise =

Natural light display observed in space

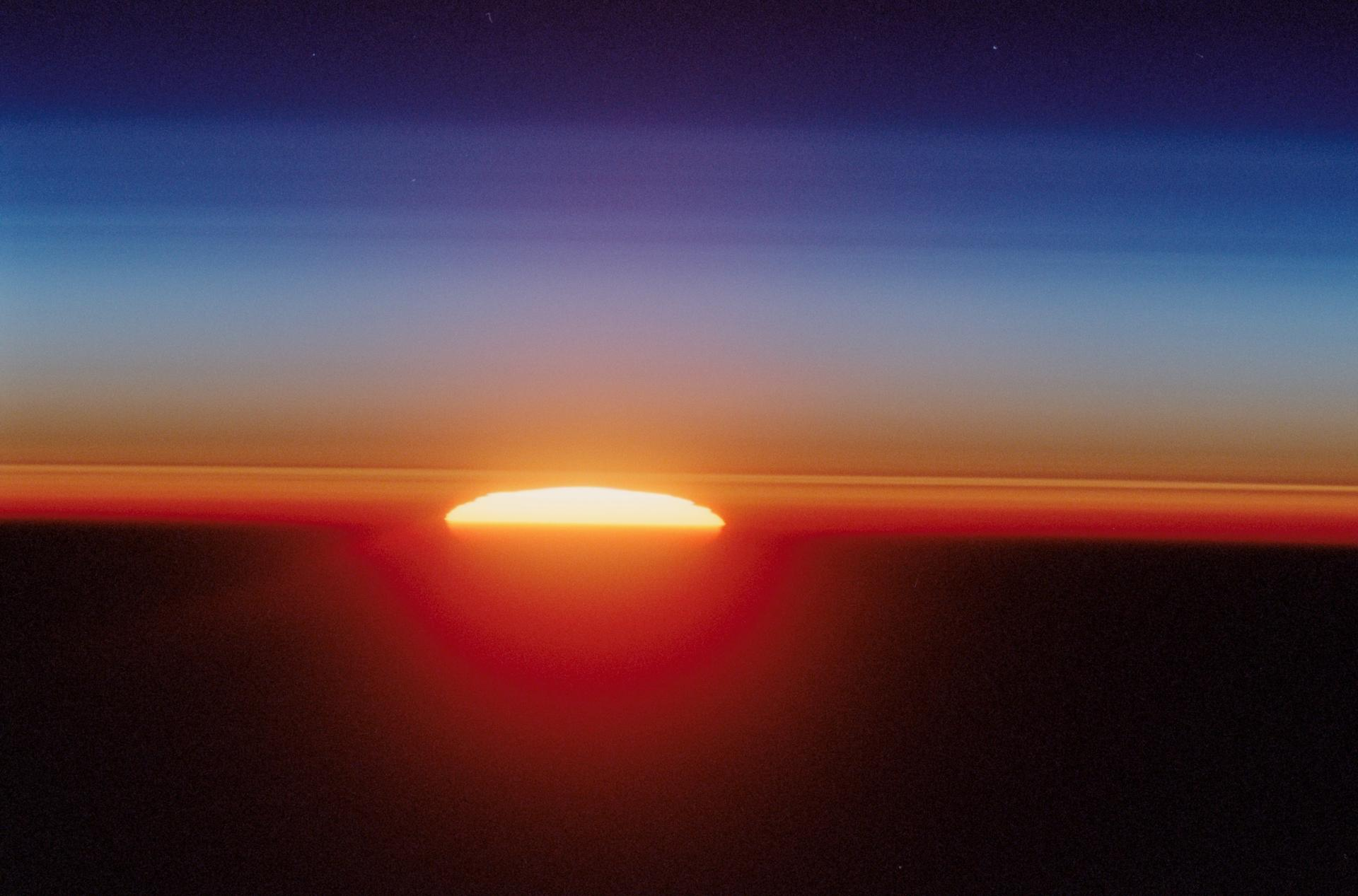
An image of an orbital sunrise taken in June 2002 during the STS-111 space endeavor.

An orbital sunrise is the natural light display observed in space during low orbit from behind Earth's horizon. Orbital sunrises occur when the orbiting body passes the day-night terminator, roughly every 90 minutes for members aboard the International Space Station An orbital sunrise typically features a thin blue arc which quickly transitions to vibrant orange and red hues due to the effects of Rayleigh scattering Orbital sunrises can also reveal polar mesospheric clouds in the atmosphere.

The first person to witness an orbital sunrise in space was the Russian cosmonaut Alexei Leonov and his colleague Pavel Belyayev during the Voskhod 2 space mission. Leonov, after returning to the spacecraft and overcome with adrenaline, found himself unable to do anything but draw with the box of colored pencils and sketchpad he'd brought with him on board. This drawing is considered to be the first art made in space.

== In popular media ==
The author and internet personality John Green has covered the topic of orbital sunrises both on his podcast The Anthropocene Reviewed and in its titular novel.
