= The Assassination of Jesse James by the Coward Robert Ford (soundtrack) =

Soundtrack album by Nick Cave and Warren Ellis
- Released: 2007
- Label: Mute

Nick Cave and Warren Ellis chronology
The Proposition (2005)	The Assassination of Jesse James by the Coward Robert Ford (2007)

Professional ratings
Review scores
Source	Rating
AllMusic	4.5/5 stars
Pitchfork Media	(7.2/10)
PopMatters	7/10 stars

The Assassination of Jesse James by the Coward Robert Ford by Nick Cave and Warren Ellis is the official soundtrack album to the movie of the same name. Cave and Ellis composed all the music. According to the CD liner notes, Cave played piano, celesta and other keyboards, while Ellis played violin, viola, guitar and keyboards. Furthermore, some songs featured percussion, a small string ensemble and other instruments.

The album is the second film score collaboration between Cave and Ellis, after their work for the 2005 soundtrack to the film The Proposition. Cave and Ellis are bandmates in Nick Cave and the Bad Seeds, with Cave a founding member from the band's 1983 formation and Ellis joining in 1997.

== Track listing ==
No.	Title	Length
1.	"Rather Lovely Thing"	3:13
2.	"Moving On"	2:32
3.	"Song for Jesse"	2:35
4.	"Falling"	2:54
5.	"Cowgirl"	4:05
6.	"The Money Train"	2:38
7.	"What Must Be Done"	1:57
8.	"Another Rather Lovely Thing"	3:27
9.	"Carnival"	2:52
10.	"Last Ride Back to KC"	5:24
11.	"What Happens Next"	2:08
12.	"Destined for Great Things"	2:25
13.	"Counting the Stars"	1:19
14.	"Song for Bob"	6:03

== Unreleased songs ==
There are six untitled score pieces composed by Cave and Ellis which do not appear on the retail soundtrack. They include:

- 2 pieces from the end credits of the film, played after "What Must Be Done"
- 2 pieces available for listen on the official website (tracks 12 and 13), streaming audio.
- 1 piece played during the DVD menu and heard throughout the movie, a slightly quirkier rendition of the track "Moving On".
- 1 piece, notable for being the eerie, vacant sound heard during the intense moments in the film, such as: when Jesse holds up his lantern awaiting the Blue Cut train, when the screen introduces "April 3rd, 1882", and when Bob sees the headline of the newspaper on assassination day.

There is a song played by a busker in a bar, played by Nick Cave, towards the end of the film entitled "Jesse James" or "The Ballad of Jesse James". This was written by Billy Gashade in 1882 and has been modified and covered by Uncle Dave Macon in 1929, Ken Curtis and the Sons of the Pioneers in the 1930s, Woody Guthrie in 1940, Burl Ives in the 1940s, Ramblin' Jack Elliott, Cisco Houston, The Kingston Trio, Eddy Arnold, Bob Seger in 1972, Ry Cooder in 1980, The Pogues in 1985 and Van Morrison in 1998.

== White Lunar ==
Cave and Ellis released a double disc album titled White Lunar in September 2009, which contains several tracks from the Jesse James score, as well as tracks they composed for other films up to 2009.
