= Nick Cave i Przyjaciele =

Nick Cave i Przyjaciele : W moich ramionach

Live album by Nick Cave
- Released: 2002
- Recorded: 14 March 1999
- Venue: Przeglad Piosenki Aktorskiej, Wroclaw
- Genre: Alternative rock
- Label: Luna Music

Nick Cave i Przyjaciele (English: Nick Cave and Friends) : W Moich Ramionach (English: Into My Arms) is a live album recorded in 1999 in Poland. The performances are Nick Cave songs with lyrics translated into Polish by Roman Kołakowski. Cave appears on the 1st and 10th tracks with Stanisław Sojka.

== Track listing ==
Performers are listed in parentheses

1. "Into My Arms" (Polish: "W moich ramionach") (Stanisław Soyka and Nick Cave)
2. "Saint Huck" (Polish: "Święty Huck") (Mariusz Lubomski)
3. "Henry Lee" (Anna Maria Jopek and Maciek Maleńczuk)
4. "The Carny" (Polish: "Deszczowy klaun") (A. Matysiak)
5. "Red Right Hand" (Polish: "Krwawa prawa dłoń") (Wojciech Waglewski)
6. "The Curse of Millhaven" (Polish: "Przekleństwo Millhaven") (Kinga Preis)
7. "O'Malley's Bar" (Polish: "Bar O'Malley'a") (M. Drężek)
8. "The Mercy Seat" (Polish: "Krzesło łaski") (Kazik Staszewski)
9. "Where the Wild Roses Grow" (Polish: "Tam, gdzie rosną dzikie róże") (Anna Maria Jopek and Maciek Maleńczuk)
10. "The Weeping Song" (Polish: "Pieśn o płaczu") (Stanisław Soyka and Nick Cave)
