= Cosmic Dancer =

Sculpture by Arthur Woods

Cosmic Dancer is a sculpture by Swiss-American artist Arthur Woods that travelled to the Russian Mir space station in May 1993.

== See also ==
- Space art
