= Conquest of Space (disambiguation) =

Conquest of Space is a 1955 American science fiction film.

Conquest of Space or The Conquest of Space may also refer to:

- Conquest of Space (TV series), a 1969 Canadian television series
- The Conquest of Space, a 1949 speculative science book by Willy Ley
- The Conquest of Space (1931), a 1931 nonfiction book by David Lasser

== See also ==
- Man Will Conquer Space Soon!, a series of 1950s-era Collier's articles
- Space Race, the Cold War competition between the US and USSR to conquer space milestones
