= Chesley Bonestell =

American science fiction and space illustrator (1888–1986)

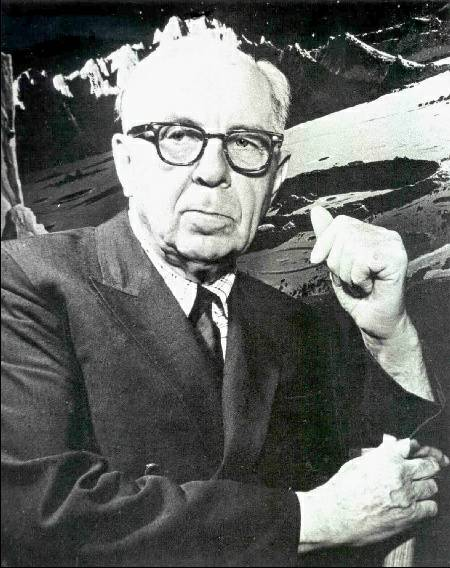
- Bonestell c. 1964
- Born: Chesley Knight Bonestell Jr. January 1, 1888; San Francisco, California, U.S.
- Died: June 11, 1986 (aged 98); Carmel, California, U.S.
- Occupation: Artist
- Spouses: Mary Hilton (m. 1911–1918) Ruby Helder (m. 1920; died 1938) Mary Hilton (m. 1940–1961) Hulda von Neumayer Ray (m. 1962)
- Children: Jane Bonestell (1912–1989)
- Writing career
- Period: 1944–1986
- Subjects: Science, science fiction, space
- Notable awards: Klumpke-Roberts Award (1976)

Chesley Knight Bonestell Jr. (January 1, 1888 – June 11, 1986) was an American painter, designer, and illustrator, best known for his realistic-looking paintings of space exploration, including future spacecraft and scenes set on moons and planets in the Solar System. His work helped inspire the American space program and appeared in popular magazines and books from the 1940s into the 1970s. He is considered one of the founders of "space art" for scientific illustration and his style has been influential in science fiction art, illustration, and cinema.

Physicist Sidney Perkowitz summarized his historic reputation as: "Chesley Bonestell portrayed planets, stars, and spacecraft with stunning, near-photographic realism. Collaborating with experts like rocket pioneer Wernher von Braun, Bonestell's renditions combined the best scientific and engineering knowledge of the time, and scientific exactness, with artistic imagination". According to American space policy expert Howard E. McCurdy: "No artist had more impact on the emerging popular culture of space in America than Chesley Bonestell. Through his visual images, he stimulated the interest of a generation of Americans and showed how space travel would be accomplished". Noted astronomer and science communicator Carl Sagan put his artwork in personal terms: "I didn't know what other worlds looked like until I saw Bonestell's paintings of the solar system".

Bonestell's artwork from the 1940s through the 1950s into the early 1960s, along with his innovative techniques and visualization skills, have led many artists and scholars to dub Chesley Bonestell "the father of modern space art" for his pioneering role.

== Early life and education ==
Bonestell (pronounced BONN-e-stell) was born January 1, 1888, in San Francisco, California, to Chesley Knight Bonestell and his wife, Jovita (née Ferrer). Jovita was a daughter of Manuel Y. Ferrer, a Mexican musician.

Chesley attended Clement Grammar School, Dickensen's Academy, and St. Ignatius College Preparatory, and George Bates University School. After graduating in 1904, he worked for his grandfather, Louis H. Bonestell, at the Bonestell Paper Company. For the next three years, he attended evening classes at the Hopkins Art Institute.

== Career ==
His first astronomical painting was done in 1905. After seeing Saturn through the 12-inch (300 mm) telescope at San Jose's Lick Observatory, he rushed home to paint what he had seen. The painting was destroyed in the fire that followed the 1906 earthquake. Between 1915 and 1918, he exhibited lithographs in the 4th and 7th annual exhibitions of the California Society of Etchers (now the California Society of Printmakers) in San Francisco.

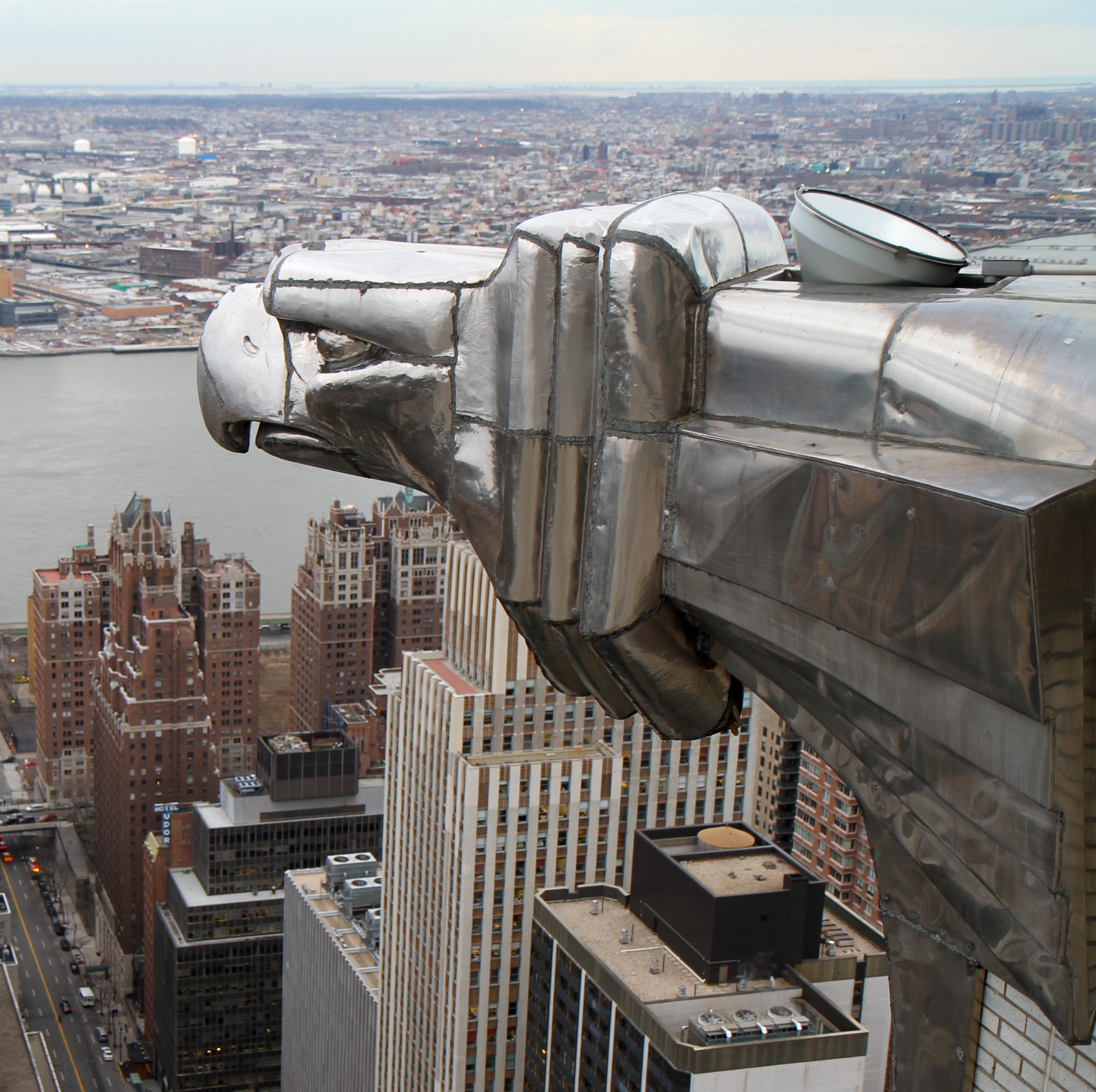
Chrysler Building stainless-steel Art Deco eagle (1930)

Bonestell enrolled as an undergraduate at Columbia University in New York City in 1907, adopting an architecture major. Dropping out in June 1910, he worked as a renderer and designer for several of the leading architectural firms of the time, including the firm of Willis Polk, "The Man Who Rebuilt San Francisco."

Bonestell moved to England in 1920, where he rendered architectural subjects for the Illustrated London News. While in England, he met British artist Scriven Bolton, who was an early pioneer of space art. He returned to New York in 1926. While with William van Alen, he and Warren Straton designed the Art Deco façade of the Chrysler Building as well as its distinctive eagles. During this same period, he designed the Plymouth Rock Memorial, the U.S. Supreme Court Building, the New York Central Building, Manhattan office and apartment buildings and several state capitols.

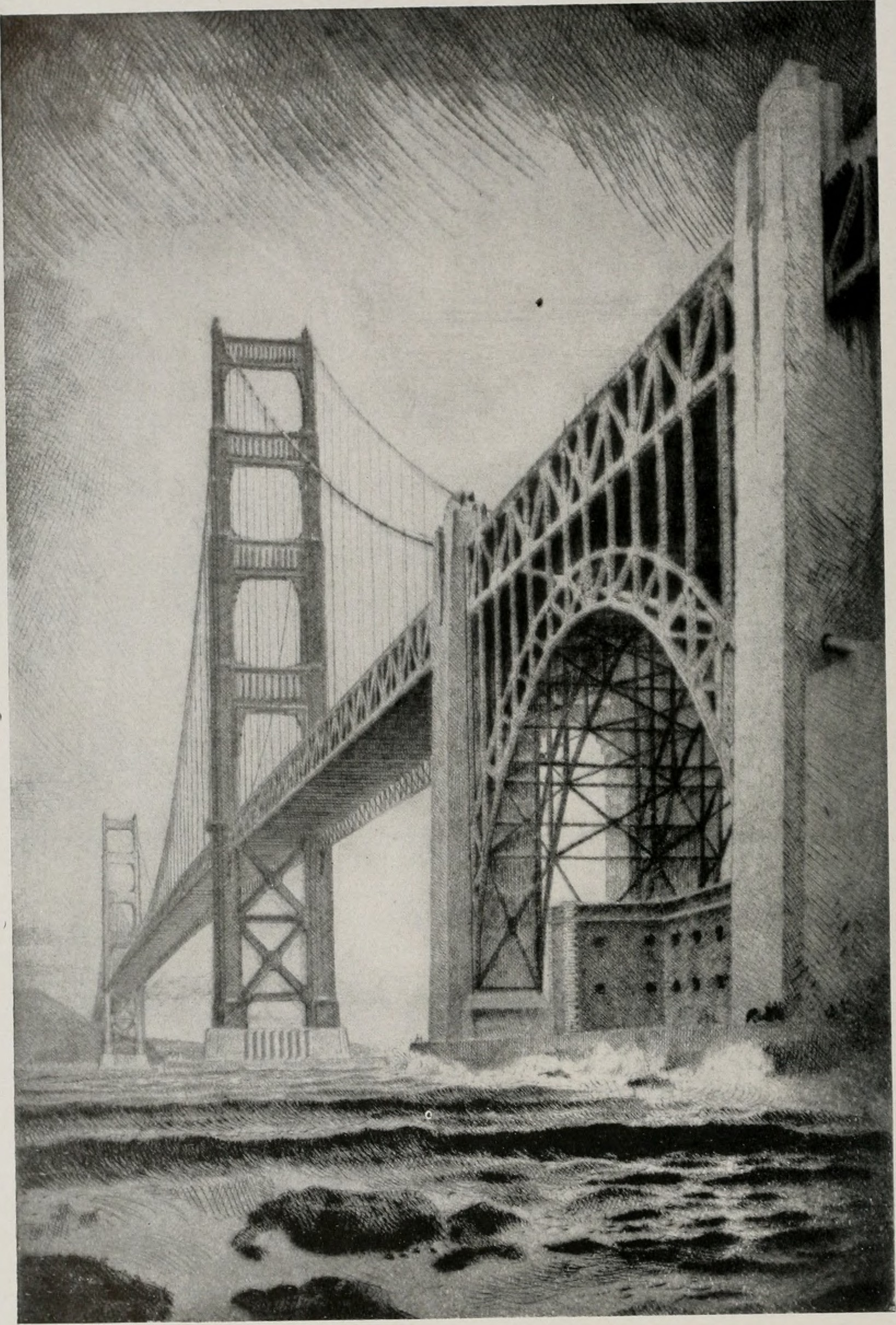
Etching by Bonestell in 1933 when construction of the Golden Gate Bridge was just beginning, showing the bridge as completed in 1937

Returning to the West Coast, he prepared illustrations of the chief engineer's plans for the Golden Gate Bridge for the benefit of funders. In the late 1930s he moved to Hollywood, where he worked (without screen credit) as a special effects artist, creating matte paintings for films, including The Hunchback of Notre Dame (1939), Citizen Kane (1941) and The Magnificent Ambersons (1942).

=== Magazines, books, motion pictures, public artworks ===
Drawing on his motion picture experience, Bonestell realized that he could combine what he had learned about camera angles, miniature modeling, and painting techniques with his lifelong interest in astronomy. His inspiration to create astronomical paintings would come as well from his encounters with Scriven Bolton in the 1920s (whose work he sometimes criticized) and perhaps even more so from the French artist-astronomer Lucien Rudaux, who had created scientifically based paintings with imagined views from the surfaces of moons and planets in the 1930s. Bonestell would add elements of drama along with a more photographic-style precision in the details. The result was a series of paintings of Saturn as seen from several of its moons that was published in Life in 1944. Nothing like these had ever been seen before: they looked as though photographers had been sent into space. His painting "Saturn as Seen from Titan" is perhaps the most famous astronomical landscape ever, and is nicknamed "the painting that launched a thousand careers." It was constructed with a combination of clay models, photographic tricks and various painting techniques (Titan has a thick haze; such a view is probably not possible in reality). Bonestell followed up the sensation these paintings created by publishing more paintings in many leading national magazines. These and others were eventually collected in the best-selling book The Conquest of Space (1949), produced in collaboration with author Willy Ley.

Beyond their technical brilliance, Bonestell's evocative images could convey a poetic sense of wonder at scenes and vistas humans had yet to experience directly. Bonestell's space scenes commonly included explorers in spacesuits seen as tiny figures in vast and strange extraterrestrial landscapes, viewed from an elevated vantage point. This artistic formula echoed 19th century American romantic landscape painters (commonly referred to as the Hudson River School), who often added barely noticed humans in the foregrounds of sweeping vistas of mountains, valleys, and canyons set in the American wilderness, intended to inspire awe.

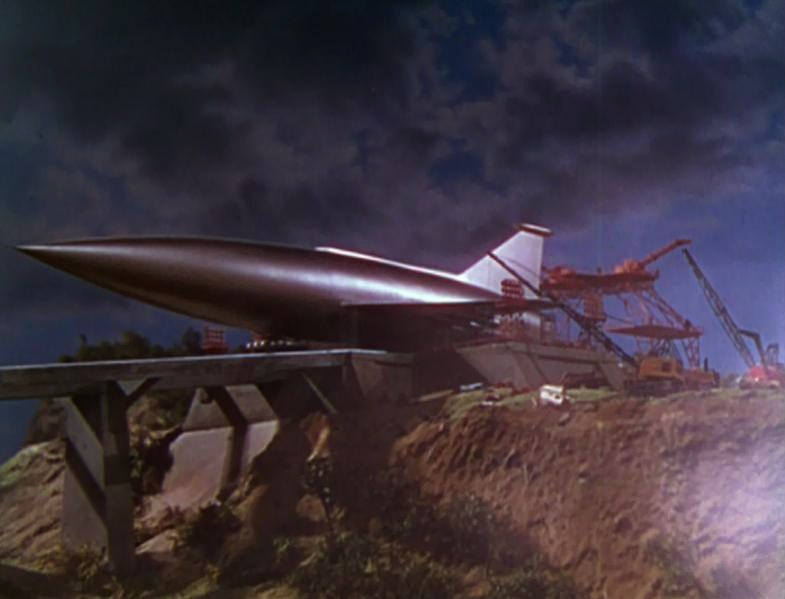
"Space ark" spaceship from When Worlds Collide (1951), model designed by Chesley Bonestell

Bonestell's last work in Hollywood was contributing special effects art and technical advice to the seminal science fiction films produced by George Pal in the 1950s, including Destination Moon, When Worlds Collide, The War of the Worlds, and Conquest of Space.

Science fiction author Robert A. Heinlein described working with Bonestell on the 1950 motion picture Destination Moon in the July 1950 issue of Astounding Science Fiction, noting: "Mr. Bonestell knows more about the surface appearance of the Moon than any other living man". Bonestell produced the matte paintings and lunar landscape background on the set, after persuading Heinlein to change the crater landing site from Aristarchus to the more northern Harpalus so Earth could be in view near the horizon in the background. However, Bonestell was unhappy with the inaccurate cracks on the lunar surface added by the art director Ernst Fegté to suggest greater depth and perspective within the limited size of the set. Heinlein and Bonestell worked out the original design for the single-stage atomic Moon rocket Luna based on the German V-2 rocket with added wings and large slanting landing struts at the base. Ernst Fegté modified Bonestell's design to remove the pair of upper wings and convert the landing struts into four enlarged tail fins to serve as wing-like landing supports on a more slender and tapered body shape. (Bonestell's design for a winged rocket with landing struts later appeared in the non-Pal 1951 low-budget science fiction film Flight to Mars, produced by Walter Mirisch.) Bonestell was interviewed on the set of Destination Moon during an episode of the news and culture program City at Night on KTLA television in Los Angeles in October 1949, which also highlighted his artwork in the recently published book Conquest of Space by Willy Ley.

Bonestell's work on the 1951 When Worlds Collide included the design of the spaceship model for the "space ark" that humans use to escape the destruction of Earth. The film's rushed production toward the end, however, meant that the rather cartoonish-looking painted landscapes used to depict the planet Zyra that the survivors see after they land were only early sketches and not the much more realistic finished work with miniatures that Bonestell had intended to provide.

Of particular note, Bonestell created the paintings for the partly animated prologue sequence in the 1953 The War of the Worlds, which depicted a Martian city with canals and views of the other planets of the solar system (except Venus) as they were understood at the time, including an inaccurate "volcanic" surface on Jupiter. The scenes were narrated by Sir Cedric Hardwicke, who explained why only Earth seemed suitable to the Martians for a new home as their own planet reached exhaustion. Less memorably, Bonestell's moonscape art appeared (without permission) in the campy, low-budget Cat-Women of the Moon in 1953.

Bonestell and Willy Ley were consultants on Pal's 1955 film Conquest of Space about the first human expedition to Mars, which aimed to be as scientifically accurate as possible based on then current ideas and knowledge. The winged spaceraft and orbiting wheel-like space station miniature models were based on Bonestell's earlier artwork from Wernher von Braun's ideas. However, Bonestell's Martian landscapes designed to resemble Arizona-like desert vistas were not used in the final film because they did not look "unearthly" enough. Bonestell recalled the unwelcome changes: "When I went on the stage of Mars with Dr Robert Richardson from Palomar Observatory, what did I see? Red sawdust all over the stage, with hunks of black coal and great big pieces of glass that they'd gotten out of some bathroom."

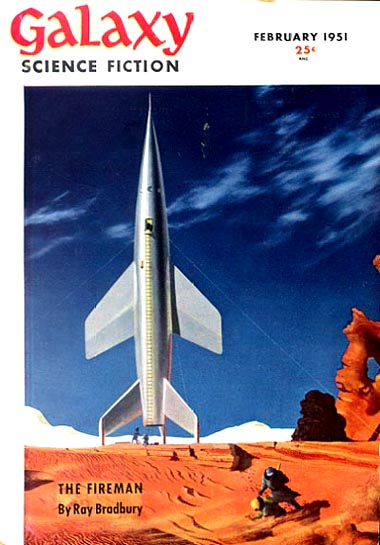
Bonestell's first cover for Galaxy Science Fiction (February 1951), The Tying Down of a Spaceship on Mars in Desert Sandstorm with dark blue sky

Beginning with the October 1947 issue of Astounding Science Fiction, Bonestell painted more than 60 cover illustrations for science fiction magazines, primarily The Magazine of Fantasy & Science Fiction, in the 1950s through 1970s. Bonestell admitted that he had little personal interest in reading science fiction, preferring history and factual scientific content, but was happy for the income his cover art brought in. He also illustrated many fiction and non-fiction book covers.

When rocket scientist and engineer Wernher von Braun organized a space flight symposium for Collier's, he invited Bonestell to illustrate his concepts for the future of spaceflight. For the first time, spaceflight was shown to be a matter of the near future. Von Braun and Bonestell showed that it could be accomplished with the technology then existing in the mid-1950s, and that the question was that of money and will. Coming as they did at the beginning of the Cold War and just before the sobering shock of the launch of Sputnik, the 1952–1954 Collier's series, "Man Will Conquer Space Soon!", was instrumental in kick-starting America's space program.

A notable percentage of Bonestell's paintings from the 1940s and the 1950s portrayed views of the Moon and Mars as seen close-up from space and on the surface, often with human explorers and spacecraft added for scale and narrative. Some of the details, however, represented scientific thinking that turned out to be inaccurate or that sometimes reflected Bonestell's own artistic license to enhance visual appeal.

=== Moon scenes ===
The airless, waterless environment of the Moon was assumed to experience little or no erosion, apart from the effects of extreme hot and cold (thermal erosion) during the lunar day-and-night cycle, resulting only in very fine dust particles that would settle on the surface (The Conquest of Space, Chapter 2)—meaning that steep, jutting, sharp-edged landforms in lower lunar gravity in principle could remain unchanged over long ages. However, telescopic views of the Moon already had suggested by the 1940s and earlier that lunar landforms were in fact more rounded in shape. Bonestell apparently was aware of the evidence, but exercised a personal choice to depict more interesting steep and rugged lunar terrain that would become iconic in the popular imagination. The September 1945 issue of Mechanix Illustrated featured the article "Rocket to the Moon" by Willy Ley, with color illustrations by Bonestell, including the cover depicting a huge bullet-shaped rocket being readied for launch. Accompanying the text inside, Bonestell depicted views of Earth and the lunar surface from space, including vistas observed through portals on the smaller crewed rocket now free of the outer shell that powered the launch. After the success of his imagined views of Saturn seen from its different moons for Life in 1944, Bonestell created another set of photo-like paintings for the magazine in 1946 for a journey from Earth to the Moon and back by rocket. Other notable lunar scenes included a winged rocket on the Moon from 1948 (on the dust cover of the 1949 book The Conquest of Space), the rocky lunar landscapes in the 1950 motion picture Destination Moon, and explorers with moontractors above a lunar plain (from Collier's Weekly in 1952). Bonestell's more dramatic version of lunar vistas became what many thought the Moon should have looked like. As reported by special effects expert Douglas Trumbull in the 2018 documentary Chesley Bonestell: A Brush with the Future, director Stanley Kubrick chose to depict the surface of the Moon in his 1968 motion picture 2001: A Space Odyssey after Bonestell's sharp and craggy vision rather than recreate the more accurate, but visually duller, worn-down rolling vistas revealed by lunar probes in the 1960s.

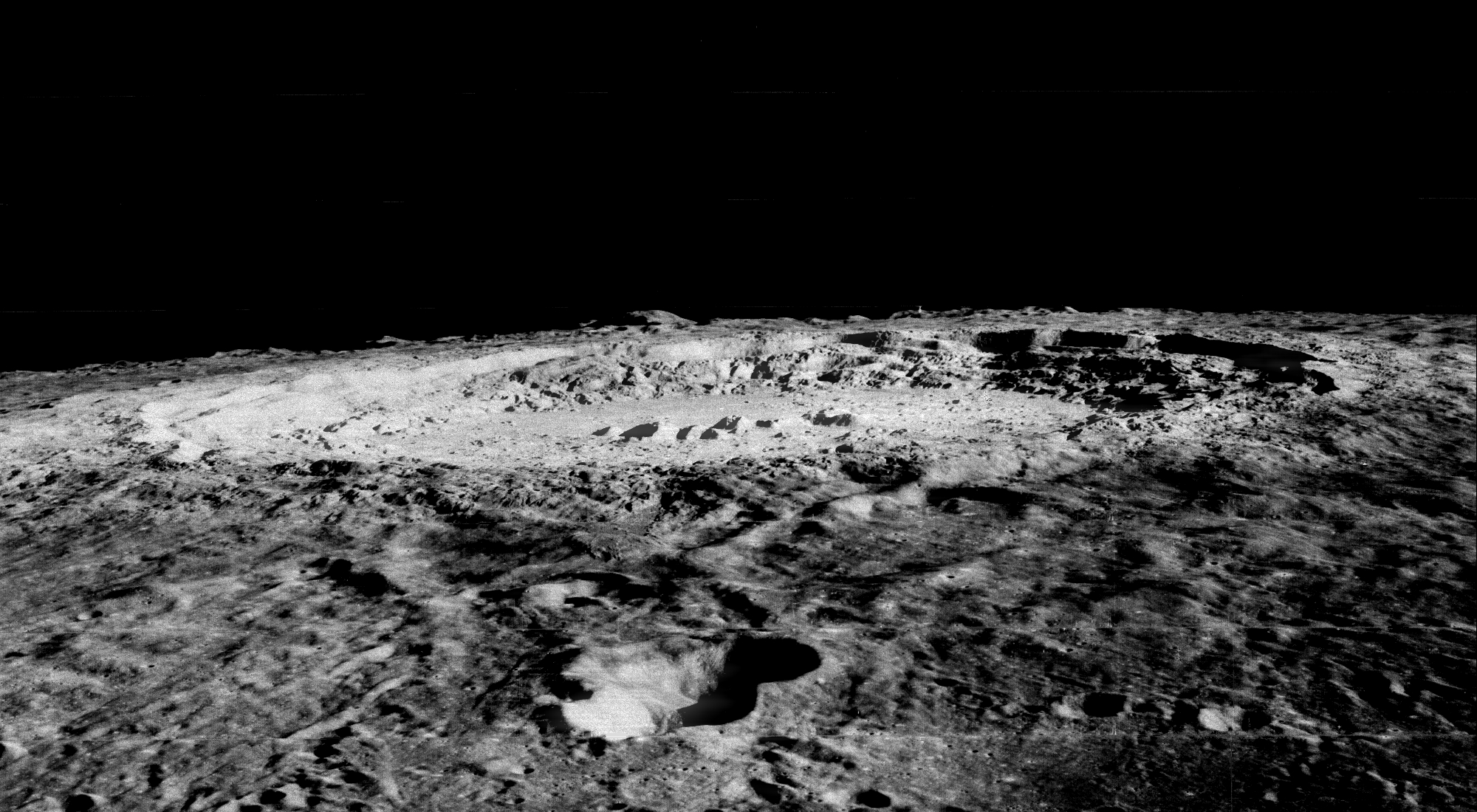
Lunar Orbiter 2 view from 1966 of the crater Copernicus showing more rounded and eroded topography on the Moon—refuting the dramatic sharp and craggy lunar terrain Bonestell depicted in the 1940s and 1950s

Between 1957 and 1970, the Charles Hayden Planetarium in Boston displayed "A Lunar Landscape", a ten-by-forty-foot, oil-on-canvas mural depicting the Moon's surface, painted by Bonestell. The Boston Museum of Science had commissioned the giant work in 1956, completed in 1957. The imagined lunarscape presented a dramatic panorama of craggy, sharp-edged mountains and craters with Earth in the sky as seen from the opposite wall of a large crater. The vista was lit by the searing, slanting rays of the Sun on the higher peaks and by the bluish glow reflected from the Earth within the otherwise shadowed regions of the crater. Moon probes and human exploration in the 1960s and 1970s found that most of the real lunar topography was rounded and worn down by millions of years of micrometeorite and larger impacts, not sharp and rugged. The planetarium judged the mural outdated and inaccurate, and removed it from display in 1970. The work became part of the Smithsonian National Air and Space Museum art collection in 1976. After careful restoration, the historic mural went on display in 2022 as part of the "Destination Moon" exhibit at the national museum to represent earlier ideas about space.

Bonestell painted another imagined view from the surface of the Moon in 1958—this time a 20-foot-long, 360-degree panorama for the Griffith Observatory in Los Angeles. The panorama then was photographed to create transparencies for planetarium shows. The continuous moonscape images would be projected around the horizon line of the dome to surround viewers as if they were transported to the Moon with a starfield from the Zeiss projector blazing overhead. In 1959, Bonestell created a more colorful 20-foot panorama of the surface of the moon Titan (based on his famous 1944 painting "Saturn as Seen from Titan") as a follow-up for the Griffith Observatory. The original panorama paintings of the Moon and of Titan are in the observatory’s archive collection and are sometimes put on display.

=== Mars scenes ===
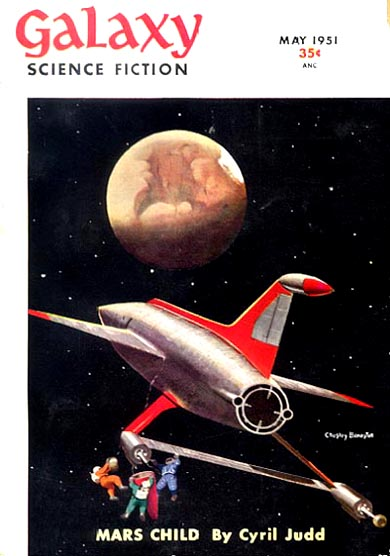
Rocket approaching Mars by Chesley Bonestell on the cover of Galaxy Science Fiction, May 1951. The planet is shown with "canals" and "green" areas as widely accepted at the time.

Mars, like Earth, was long known to have polar caps and an atmosphere (and thus would have erosion from wind and weather, and possibly from water). Well into the 1960s, however, researchers commonly accepted—but also debated—two strange phenomena observed on Mars through telescopes. Perceived linear marks dubbed "canals" appeared to connect the various darker regions on the Martian surface—such long, straight seeming furrows or channels were generally assumed by astronomers to represent unexplained natural geological features, not artificial creations by intelligent Martians, living or extinct (as once hypothesized by astronomer Percival Lowell). Another mysterious observation were apparent "green" areas on the planet's surface that changed with the seasons, interpreted by many astronomers as evidence of primitive alien plant life.

Space probes later showed that both perceived phenomena were optical illusions caused by quirks of human vision and the limitations of Earth-based telescopes blurred by our atmosphere. The connecting "canals" did not exist as actual landscape features and the supposed transitory "green" regions in reality were darker surface areas covered or uncovered by wind-blown dust. The dark regions only appeared "green" to the human eye as a complementary color when surrounded by the overall reddish hue of the planet and were not direct evidence of some kind of extraterrestrial vegetation.

In line with the astronomical interpretations of the time, Bonestell portrayed "canals" and green areas (presumably indicating plant life) in his Mars paintings from the 1940s and the 1950s. His 1948 painting of Mars as seen from its smaller moon Deimos presented what was then thought to be an accurate appearance of the planet, showing the northern polar cap, "canals", and green areas surrounded by overall flat, reddish-orange desert terrain. The caption in the book The Conquest of Space noted "Checked for color and 'canals' by Dr. Edison Pettit".

Bonestell also included canals and green areas in some of his landscape scenes of the Martian surface such as "A Fog-Filled Canal on Mars". A notably evocative painting from 1949 depicted a Martian sunset as seen from the polar cap, with water melting from ice and snow, then flowing down a straight "canal" bordered by green patches that spread out into a reddish plain. Again, the 1949 book caption noted that the color had been checked by "Dr. Edison Pettit of Mount Wilson and Palomar Observatories".

Bonestell's likely most famous Martian landscape painting is "The Exploration of Mars" (1953), now on display in the Kenneth C. Griffin Exploring the Planets Gallery at the Smithsonian National Air and Space Museum. The envisioned future scene shows humans in blue spacesuits surveying the planet's rust-colored surface of sand and rock. The return rocket, standing vertically, has been separated from the horizontal winged spacecraft that landed on the sandy plain using skids. A party of explorers in the foreground examines the eroded outcrops. The rugged, reddish desert landforms are close to accurate, but the Martian daylight sky is now known to be tinted red as well by dust and haze in the thin atmosphere, not a clear, deep dark blue with a few visible stars as portrayed.

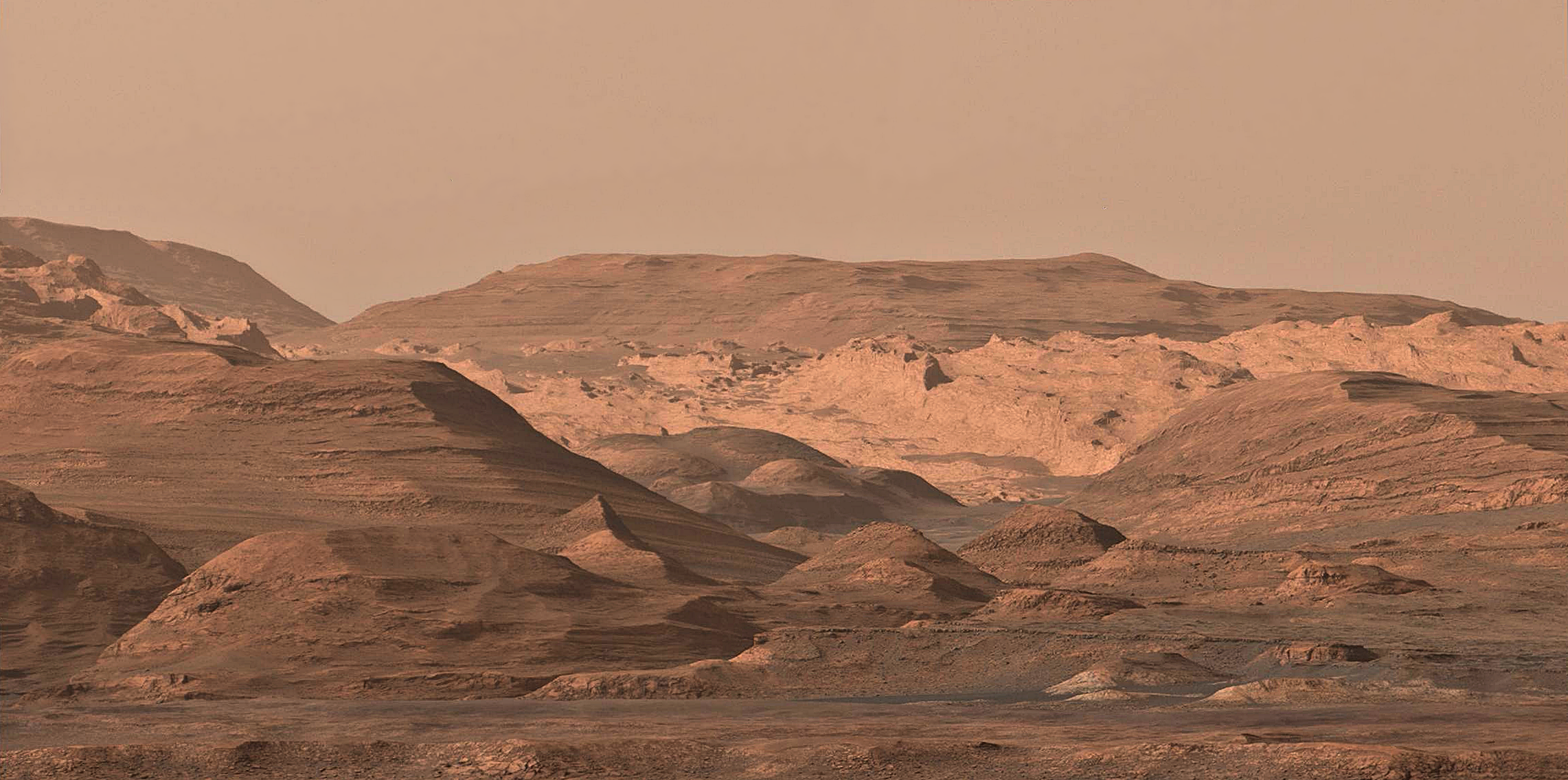
A photographic panorama by the Curiosity Rover in 2015 of a Martian landscape looking towards Mount Sharp in Gale Crater. Colors are approximately what a human would see, including a reddish sky—unlike the deep blue Martian sky depicted by Bonestell in his paintings.

A curious detail in the scene is a soft greenish area along the bottom of the mesas in the distance, likely meant to suggest patches of primitive plant life. The painting figured prominently in the 1956 book The Exploration of Mars, with text by Willy Ley and Wernher von Braun, and illustrations by Bonestell. Intended for a general audience, the publication detailed a proposed expedition to Mars based on technology available in mid-1950s, and was scaled down from the Mars expedition described in Collier's magazine in 1954. The Mars mission's accomplished scientific results are said to include "a vast collection of minerals and specimens of Martian plant life" (Chapter 8, pg. 164). In an earlier chapter (Chapter 4, pg. 85), the authors summarized the claimed scientific "consensus" at the time: "And this is the picture of Mars at midcentury: a small planet of which three-quarters is cold desert, with the rest covered with a sort of plant life that our biological knowledge cannot quite encompass. Although the air is thin, like ours 11 miles above sea level, this plant life seems to be doing well."

Mars landers in the 1970s onward found no evidence of life on the surface and revealed a hostile, sterilizing ultraviolet radiation environment, with an atmosphere 100 times (not 10 times) thinner than on Earth, corresponding to an altitude of 28 miles (45 km) above sea level. Bonestell's highly detailed "Exploration of Mars" painting nonetheless represents a once scientifically credible vision from the 1950s of what the first humans to reach Mars might see and encounter.

=== The World We Live In contributions ===
Between 1952 and 1954, Life magazine published a 13-part series called The World We Live In with text by Lincoln Barnett. The articles were generously illustrated with art and photographs, and reflected the common scientific thinking at the time before important advances such as evidence for the "Big Bang" theory and an understanding of plate tectonics. Bonestell's work featured prominently in the first and last parts of the series: Part I The Earth Is Born (December 8, 1952) and Part XIII The Starry Universe (December 20, 1954). Both issues featured a Bonestell painting on the cover. The series was edited into a large format book in 1955 that became a major best seller.

"The Earth is Born" was also the title of a notable Bonestell painting from 1952 depicting an early stage in the formation of the planet. The work was presented as a double-page spread in the article (flipped with the storms on the right to match the article discussion) and in a cropped view on the cover of the issue. The planet's surface glows red with lava while giant storms rain from the early atmosphere, and a still molten Moon hovers huge on the horizon. The caption "Continents Congeal" explained: "In this vista of the cooling planet the observer is a half mile above the surface; the continental cliffs rise 1,200 feet; the moon rides barely 10,000 miles away. Meteorites of all sizes bombard the earth incessantly, blasting craters in the hardening rocks." The earliest stage of Earth's history is now called the Hadean eon. Bonestell's image has appeared in many places since (including on the dust cover for the 1955 book edition of The World We Live In) and remains largely accurate based on later research. However, his sequential representation of the different stages of Earth from its beginning to eventual destruction shows the current continents as constant in their shapes and locations throughout all of the planet's history, contrary to the modern understanding of the formation and evolution of continents as driven by plate tectonics.

"The Starry Universe" in 1954 featured Bonestell paintings of the surfaces of Mercury and of Mars (showing a desert bordered by a green area), and the rings of Saturn. Beyond the solar system, he portrayed colliding galaxies and double star systems seen from hypothetical planets, including Beta Lyrae with heated gas spiraling outward into space from a pair of stars squashed into ovals by gravity.

=== Speculative spacecraft ===
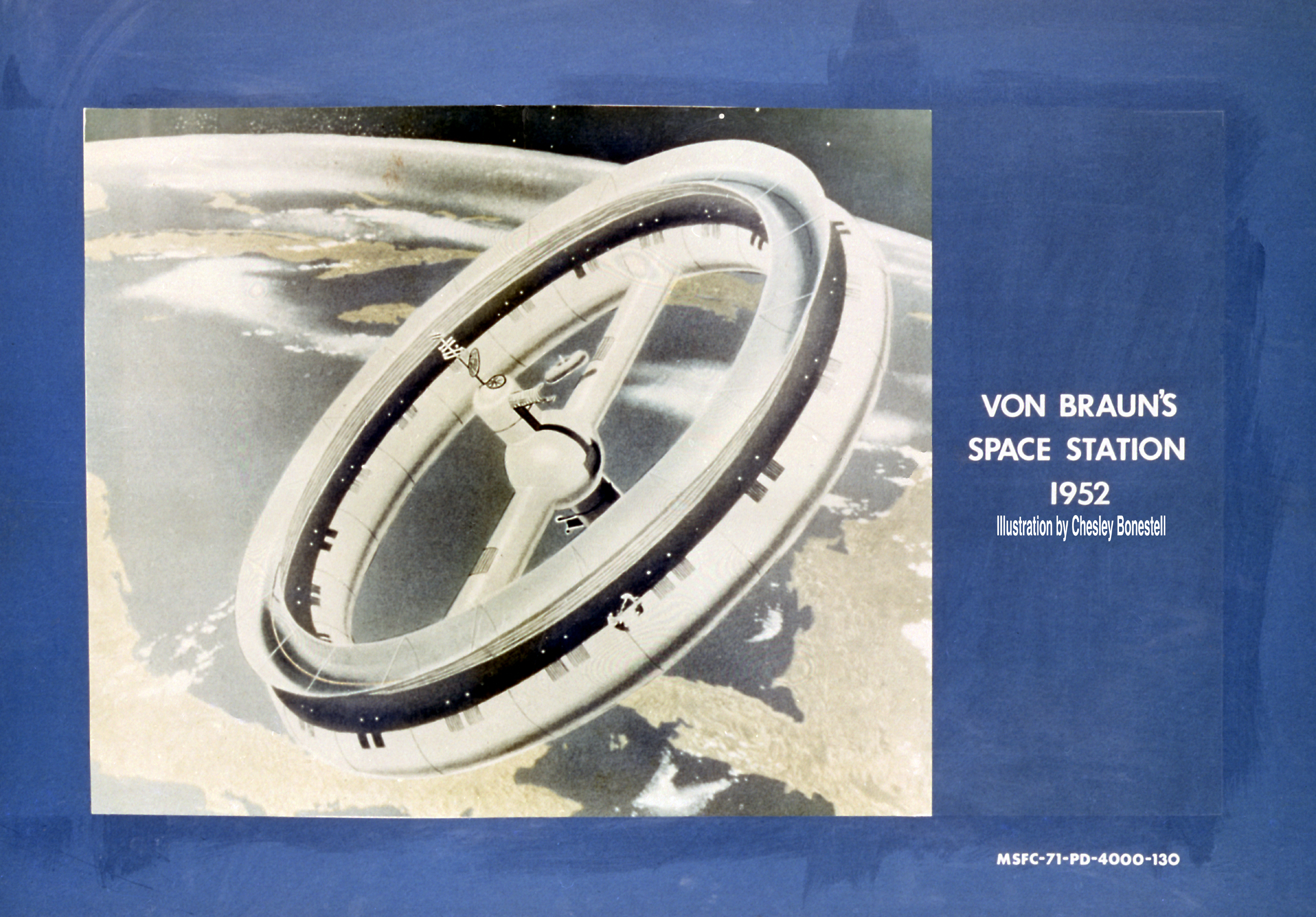
Chesley Bonestell's illustration for Wernher von Braun's orbiting space station concept. The wheel-like design would allow the station to rotate and create artificial gravity through centrifugal force.

A major subject in Bonestell's space art was the imagined spacecraft that would carry humans beyond Earth to new and unexplored places—from piloted rockets to space stations to Moon landers and Mars exploration fleets. His highly detailed spacecraft were famously rendered with a distinctive photo-like precision, three-dimensional look, and visual believability. The technical quality of their appearance reflected on the one hand Bonestell's training in architecture and in engineering, but also his own multistep technique in producing his paintings, often involving photography.

In his work from the 1940s and the 1950s, Bonestell typically would create three-dimensional models for his rocky space landscapes, using clay, plaster, and plasticine to fashion mountains and craters that would be lit from an angle with strong light, then photographed using a pinhole camera without a lens. This technique (learned from British early space artist and amateur astronomer Scriven Bolton while in England) allowed a greater depth of field and kept the entire scene in sharp focus at every point. An enlarged photographic print then would become the basis for a detailed painting. In some cases, Bonestell painted directly onto an enlarged photographic print to preserve as much fine detail as possible. He also applied very thin layers of oil glaze to enhance a photographic quality in his work. However, he later simplified or abandoned some of these complex and time-consuming artistic procedures.

Photography was key in creating his images of spacecraft as well. He constructed detailed scale models of spacecraft out of cardboard and other materials, which he then photographed in strong sunlight from different angles. His paintings were developed based on enlarged photographs, adding a realistic quality with rigorously accurate foreshortening, relative scale and proportions, perspective angles, and illumination, shadow, and reflection effects, drawing as well on skills from his training in architecture. (His hundreds of original preliminary spacecraft models have not survived (known only from photographs), as noted by Bonestell exhibit curator Ben Heywood in the documentary Chesley Bonestell: A Brush with the Future.)

"The courses I had had at Columbia University in descriptive geometry, shades and shadows and perspective, enabled me to handle some very complicated problems, and my courses in structural engineering helped me to understand the mechanics of space machinery."

— Chesley Bonestell, Worlds Beyond: The Art of Chesley Bonestell (1983, page 9)

The design of the rockets and space stations reflected the ideas of Wernher von Braun and other experts of the day, but Bonestell, with his own engineering training, also contributed to the final versions. In the Foreword to the 1964 book Beyond the Solar System (written by Willy Ley and illustrated by Bonestell), Wernher von Braun wrote that he had "learned to respect, nay fear, this wonderful artist's obsession with perfection. My file cabinet is filled with sketches of rocket ships I had prepared to help in his artwork—only to have them returned to me with penetratingly detailed questions or blistering criticism of some inconsistency or oversight."

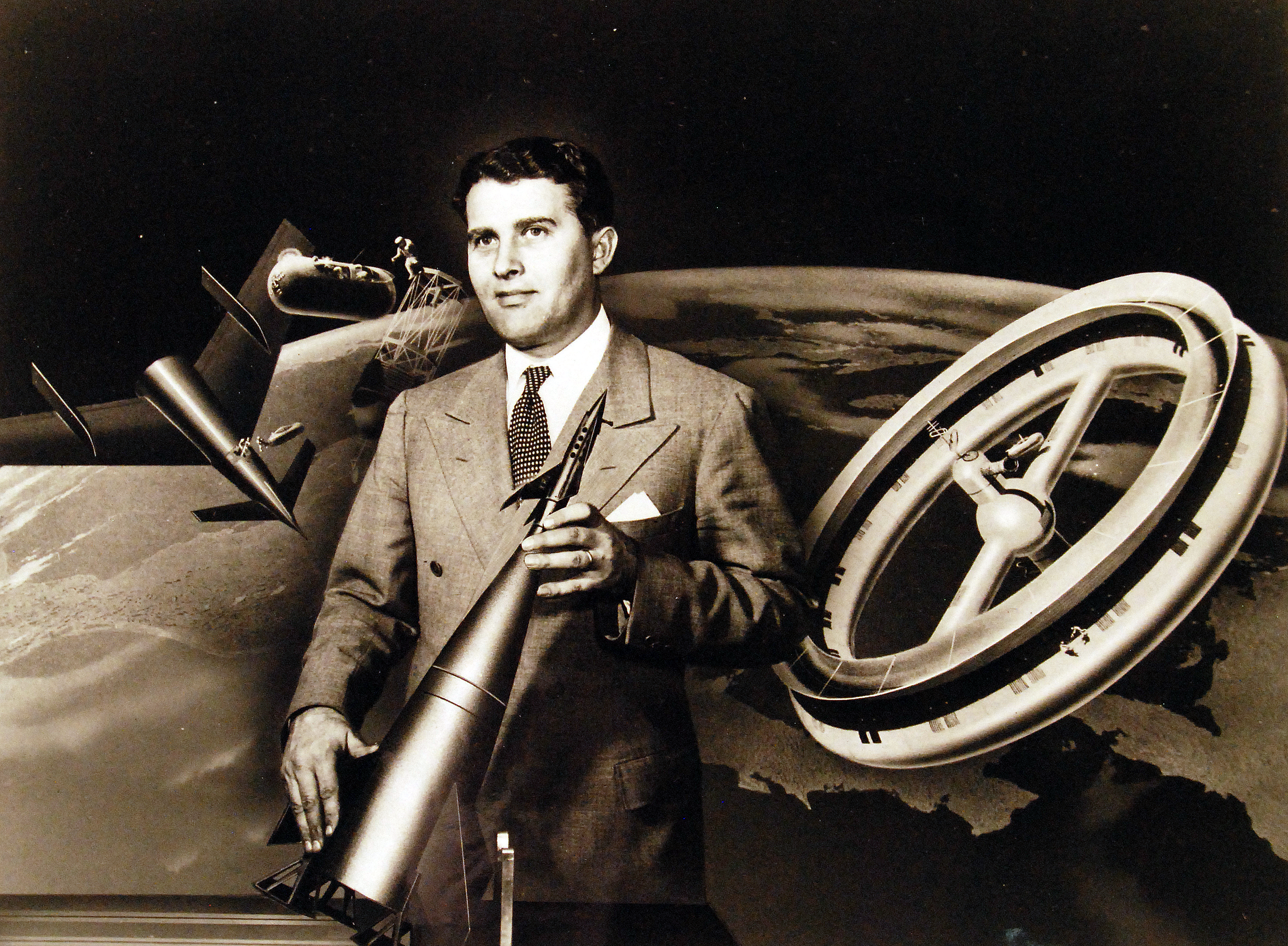
Publicity photo for 1955 US Defense Department film "Challenge of Outer Space" with Wernher von Braun standing in front of Bonestell's image of a winged spacecraft and an orbiting space station

Some of Bonestell's best known depictions of speculative spacecraft include paintings for the Collier's magazine series "Man Will Conquer Space Soon" in 1952, such as a winged rocket reaching orbit, a rotating space station in orbit and a winged rocket with a space telescope being assembled, a Moon exploration fleet being assembled in Earth orbit, and winged landing ships being assembled in orbit above Mars. Later works included a ship for mining asteroids.

=== Other subjects ===
In the late 1940s and into the 1950s, Bonestell created multiple paintings of disasters striking Manhattan, including a meteorite impact and nuclear weapon explosions. He also did the artwork for a "Picture Story" article in Coronet magazine in July 1947 that described global disasters that could bring "The End of the World". Scenarios included the Sun getting too hot, gravity from a passing white dwarf star, the Moon approaching Earth, Earth freezing after being "kidnapped" by a passing "dark star", a destructive pressure wave from a passing asteroid, and the Sun goes nova. Most of these potential disasters are implausible or reflect outdated ideas (the Sun will become a red giant star, not go "nova" in a sudden explosion).

Bonestell provided artwork for another feature in Coronet in June 1949, depicting "Seven Future Wonders of the World", some of which now exist. The anticipated wonders were: 1) making space glow with energized atomic particles to light up the night (scientifically impossible); 2) Brooklyn to Staten Island Bridge (built on a smaller scale as the Verrazzano–Narrows Bridge, opened 1964); 3) Yangzte Dam (built as Three Gorges Dam, completed 2006, electric power-generating 2012); 4) giant sea tunnel cut through the Mexican Isthmus (Isthmus of Tehuantepec) to connect the Gulf of Mexico with the Pacific Ocean, as viewed from space with a rocket (to be realized instead as the Interoceanic Corridor of the Isthmus of Tehuantepec project with ongoing construction of a railroad system with ports); 5) continuous road from Alaska to Cape Horn at the tip of South America (partly realized as the so-called Pan-American Highway intercontinental road system); 6) tunnel under the English Channel between France and Great Britain (built as the Channel Tunnel, opened in 1994); 7) giant balloons circling the Earth as satellites 1000 miles up to serve as refueling stations for rockets to the Moon and to Mars (impractical).

Returning to his interests in architecture and in history, Bonestell produced a series of paintings recreating what the 21 Catholic Spanish missions in California (many now in ruins) would have looked like during their functioning heyday in the late 18th and early 19th centuries, based on historical evidence. The paintings appeared in the book The Golden Era of the Missions, 1769-1834, published in 1974 with text by Paul C. Johnson, California writer and editor of Sunset Books. (The term "Golden Era" would not be accurate for Native Americans, however. From current perspectives, the text portion written in the early 1970s underplays the Spanish mission system's severe impact on the indigenous peoples of California, including introduced diseases, forced labor and slavery along with other forms of mistreatment, cultural suppression and erasure, and loss of land and resources, resulting in major population declines.)

== Personal life ==
After dropping out of architecture school at Columbia University in New York City in his junior year, Bonestell returned to San Francisco in 1910 to look for work. The following year, he married Mary Hilton, a childhood sweetheart. They lived in Berkeley and had a daughter Jane, born in 1912, but the couple divorced in 1918, and Bonestell moved back to New York City.

In 1920, Bonestell went to England and found work as an illustrator. While there, he met and married the young opera singer Ruby Helder (in 1920), and the two later traveled in Italy. Bonestell and his second wife moved to New York City in 1927, where he worked for architectural firms until the Wall Street crash of 1929. He returned with Ruby to Berkeley in 1931 and the following year took work with the Golden Gate Bridge project.

In 1938, he shifted his artistic work to motion pictures in Hollywood, producing matte paintings. That same year Ruby died at age 48 from alcoholism.

He remarried his first wife Mary in 1940, and a few years later began producing the space art that would make him famous. Mary died in 1961.

Bonestell moved back to Berkeley and in 1962 married Hulda Von Neumayer Ray, a photographer and long-time friend. The late 1960s social turmoil associated with Berkeley led Bonestell to move to Carmel, California in 1968, where he continued to paint. He lived there until his death in 1986 at the age of 98, with an unfinished painting on his easel. His daughter Jane died in 1989 and his widow Hulda died in 1998.

== Legacy ==
During his lifetime, Bonestell was honored internationally for the contributions he made to the birth of modern astronautics, from a bronze medal awarded by the British Interplanetary Society to a place in the International Space Hall of Fame to an asteroid named for him. The Conquest of Space won the 1951 International Fantasy Award for nonfiction, one of the first two fantasy or science fiction awards anywhere, at the British SF Convention. The Science Fiction Hall of Fame inducted Bonestell in 2005, the first year it considered non-literary contributors. (Note: After inducting 36 fantasy and science fiction writers and editors from 1996 to 2004, the hall of fame dropped "fantasy" and made non-literary contributors eligible. Alongside one writer, the first three were Bonestell in the "Art" category, "dynamation" animator Ray Harryhausen, and filmmaker Steven Spielberg.)

As pointed out in the 2018 documentary about Bonestell, the beginning of the real age of space exploration starting in the late 1950s would in a relatively short time replace or disprove many of his popular speculative depictions with genuine photographic images from space. Along with the construction of actual spacecraft, new discoveries from the 1960s onward would leave many of Bonestell’s imagined versions of space exploration from the 1940s and the 1950s more appreciated now for their historical and artistic values than for their once intended scientific accuracy or plausibility.

His paintings are prized by collectors and institutions such as the National Air and Space Museum and the Smithsonian American Art Museum. Bonestell's most famous painting is "Saturn as Seen from Titan" from 1944, which was part of a set of six paintings published in Life magazine depicting Saturn as seen from its different moons. The beautiful image shows Saturn as it might appear in the sky to a viewer standing on the moon Titan and had been carefully composed, with the angle, size, and crescent phase of the planet and its rings, and the slanting sunlight mathematically calculated. Given the known presence of an atmosphere on the distant moon, Bonestell made the Titanian sky an ethereal clear, deep, sapphire blue. On the moon's surface below, white snow and water ice cover the ground and deck out the reddish-brown rocky promontories that were rendered from photographed clay and plasticine models.

The painting later appeared in the 1949 book The Conquest of Space (including on the back dust cover) and in the 1955 book version of The World We Live In, and is often cited as the most famous work of space art. "Saturn as Seen from Titan" was reportedly Bonestell's personal favorite of his own works. The late American space artist Kim Poor called it "the painting that launched a thousand careers" in art, science, and engineering. Bonestell gave the original painting to Willy Ley, and it is now in the collection of the Adler Planetarium in Chicago. The Adler Planetarium also has the honor of hosting the largest publicly accessible collection of Bonestell's works. Additionally, in 2026, Bonestell's business archive and all copyrights previously held by his estate were acquired by the Adler.

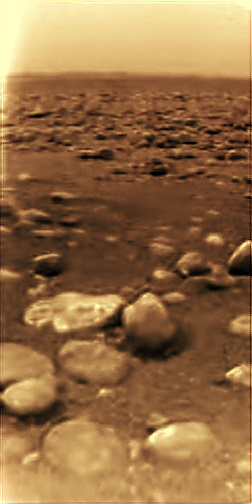
Photo of the surface of Titan showing the murky orange sky

Decades later, the Cassini orbiter and the Huygens Titan lander revealed that Titan has a dense nitrogen atmosphere that is virtually opaque because of suspended layers of orange hydrocarbon particles–making Bonestell’s vision of Saturn seen from the moon's surface in a clear, dark blue sky impossible. Instead of a rocky landscape gleaming with ice and snow, the moon's surface has dunes of dark organic material and hydrocarbon lakes and seas, all under a heavy, murky orange overcast. Undiscouraged, space artist Ron Miller speculated that there could be a zone high in Titan's upper atmosphere where Saturn could be seen clearly in a bluish sky above the dense orange haze and cloud layers, which he dubbed the "Bonestellosphere". Taking up the idea, Kim Poor painted a hypothetical view of Saturn looming above the moon's thicker lower atmosphere in 1985.

Over the years, Bonestell created at least seven versions of his famous space scene of Saturn viewed from surface of Titan, including a twenty-foot, 360-degree panorama used to create projections for the planetarium at the Griffith Observatory in 1959 as mentioned. In 1952, Bonestell painted a close copy version of the 1944 painting as a gift for his daughter, likely for her wedding. The late Microsoft cofounder Paul Allen acquired the 1952 work for his private collection in 2010. After Allen's death in 2018, his art collection was put up for sale in a series of auctions with funds to go to charitable causes. In September 2024 the 1952 "Saturn as Seen from Titan" painting went for $302,400 at auction–many times more than the original estimated bids. The same auction from Allen’s collection included other notable artworks by Bonestell, all of which sold for much more than expected, indicating increased interest in the artist's output.

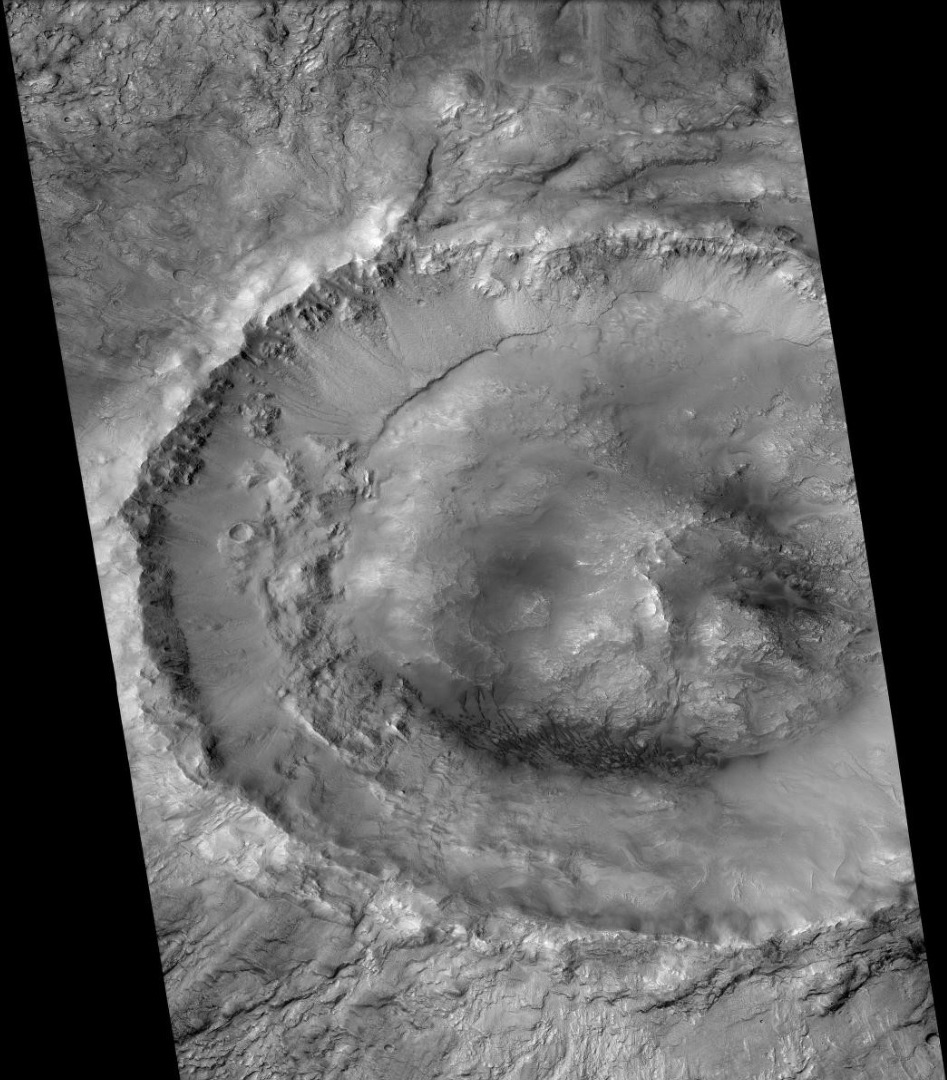
Bonestell Crater on Mars, as seen by CTX camera (on MRO)

In 1979, the International Astronomical Union's Minor Planet Center officially named the main belt asteroid 3129 "Bonestell" in honor of the artist, later stating: "(3129) Bonestell = 1979 MK2 | Discovered 1979 June 25 by E. F. Helin and S. J. Bus at Siding Spring. Named in honor of Chesley Bonestell, whose art has inspired generations of astronomers, space enthusiasts and artists. Name proposed by the first discoverer, following a suggestion from Ronald Paludan". When asked whether he would have liked a crater on the Moon named for him instead, Bonestell reportedly replied: "An asteroid is a flying mountain. I go around the Sun". Astronomer Carl Sagan noted that "it is only fitting that we give back a world to Bonestell, who has given us so many". 3129 Bonestell is 7.2 km (4.5 mi) in length. In 1997, the IAU named Bonestell crater on Mars in his honor, eleven years after the artist's death.

== Books illustrated by Bonestell ==
- Ley, Willy (1949), The Conquest of Space (Chesley Bonestell, Illustrator)
- Across the Space Frontier (1952)
- Braun, Wernher von; Fred Lawrence Whipple; Willy Ley (1953) [1952 (Collier's Man on the Moon)]. Cornelius Ryan (ed.). Conquest of the Moon. Illustrated by Chesley Bonestell, Fred Freeman, Rolf Klep. New York: The Viking Press. Illustrations by Chesley Bonestell:
  - Constructing the moonships in the space station's orbit (endpapers)
  - The space station (p. 11)
  - Spaceships coming in for a landing on the Moon (p. 63)
  - Landing on the Moon (p. 67)
  - Unloading the cargo ship on the Moon (pp. 76–77)
  - Exploration convoy crossing lunar plain (p. 101)
  - Take-off from the Moon (p 115)
- Heuer, Kenneth (1953), The End of the World (Chesley Bonestell, Illustrator) (Reprinted and revised in 1957 as The Next Fifty Billion Years: An Astronomer's Glimpse into the Future, Viking Press)
- The World We Live In (1955)
- The Exploration of Mars (1956)
- Man and the Moon (1961)
- Rocket to the Moon (1961)
- The Solar System (1961)
- Beyond the Solar System (1964)
- Mars (1964)
- Beyond Jupiter (1972)
- The Golden Era of the Missions (1974)
- Worlds Beyond: the Art of Chesley Bonestell, Frederick C. Durant and Ron Miller, Donning (1983) ISBN 0898651956
- The Art of Chesley Bonestell, Ron Miller, Paper Tiger, (2001) ISBN 978-1855858848
- Project Mars: A Technical Tale (2006)

== Films with artwork by Bonestell (abbreviated list) ==
- The Hunchback of Notre Dame (1939)
- Only Angels Have Wings (1939)
- Swiss Family Robinson (1940)
- Citizen Kane (1941)
- The Magnificent Ambersons (1942)
- Destination Moon (1950)
- When Worlds Collide (1951)
- War of the Worlds (1953)
- Cat-Women of the Moon (1953) Unauthorized use of Bonestell art from the book, The Conquest of Space
- Conquest of Space (1955)
- Challenge of Outer Space (1955) US Department of Defense short documentary film
- Men into Space (TV series, 1959–60)
- Chesley Bonestell: A Brush with the Future (feature-length documentary, 2018)

== Documentaries ==
Bonestell appeared in an interview segment in the 1985 documentary The Fantasy Film Worlds of George Pal, produced and directed by Arnold Leibovit.

The full-length film Chesley Bonestell: A Brush with the Future was released in 2018, devoted to Bonestell's life, work, career, and influence. Filmmaker Douglass M. Stewart, Jr. wrote and directed the documentary, which was coproduced by Stewart along with space artist Ron Miller and Bonestell scholar Melvin Schuetz, under associate producer Christopher Darryn. The film included interview footage with science fiction writer Ray Bradbury and special effects creator Douglas Trumbull, as well as interviews with many artists, space scholars, and museum directors. It received a number of festival awards, including the Audience Award at the 2018 Newport Beach Film Festival, the Judges Choice Award Best Documentary at the 2018 San Diego Comic-Con International Independent Film Festival, and the Feature Film Documentary Award at the 2019 Boston Science Fiction Film Festival.

== Uses in other media ==
In 2017, the first ever album of Sun Ra vocal tracks was released, The Space Age Is Here to Stay, featuring sleeve art authorized by the Bonestell estate.

In the Star Trek: The Next Generation episode "Tapestry", a young Captain Picard is involved in a fight with aliens at the Bonestell Recreation Facility, a spaceport named after the artist. This incident is first mentioned in the second-season episode "Samaritan Snare".

The noise rock band Shellac's 1998 album Terraform features sleeve artwork by Bonestell, and was authorized by his estate.

== See also ==
- Chesley Awards
- List of space artists
- Robert McCall
