= Conquest of Space =

1955 American sci-fi film

- Theatrical release poster
- Directed by: Byron Haskin
- Screenplay by: James O'Hanlon adaptation Philip Yordan; Barré Lyndon; George Worthing Yates
- Based on: book The Conquest of Space by Chesley Bonestell and Willy Ley
- Produced by: George Pal
- Starring: Walter Brooke; Eric Fleming; Mickey Shaughnessy
- Cinematography: Lionel Lindon
- Edited by: Everett Douglas
- Music by: Van Cleave
- Production company: Paramount Pictures Corp.
- Distributed by: Paramount Pictures
- Release date: April 20, 1955
- Running time: 81 minutes
- Country: United States
- Language: English
- Budget: $1.5 million

Conquest of Space is a 1955 American Technicolor science fiction film from Paramount Pictures, produced by George Pal, directed by Byron Haskin, that stars Walter Brooke, Eric Fleming, and Mickey Shaughnessy.

The story concerns the first interplanetary flight to Mars, carrying a crew of five, and launched from Earth orbit near "The Wheel", humankind's first space station. On their long journey they encounter various dangers, both from within and without, that nearly destroy the mission.

== Plot ==
Humankind has achieved space flight capability and built the Wheel space station in orbit 1,075 miles (1,730 km) above Earth. It is commanded by its designer, Colonel Samuel T. Merritt. His son, Captain Barney Merritt, having been aboard for a year, wants to return to Earth.

A giant spaceship has been built in a nearby orbit, and an Earth inspector arrives aboard the station with new orders: Merritt Sr. is being promoted to general and will command the new spaceship, now being sent to Mars instead of the Moon. As General Merritt considers his crew of three enlisted men and one officer, his close friend, Sgt. Mahoney volunteers. The general turns him down for being 20 years too old. Hearing that Mars is the new destination, Barney Merritt volunteers to be the second officer.

Right after the crew watches a TV broadcast from their family and friends, the mission blasts off. The general's undiagnosed and growing space fatigue is beginning to seriously affect his judgement: reading his Bible frequently, he has doubts about the righteousness of the mission. After launch, Sgt. Mahoney is discovered to be a stowaway, having hidden in a crew spacesuit. Their piloting radar antenna later fails, and two crewmen go outside to make repairs. They manage to get it working just as their monitors show a glowing planetoid coming at them. The general fires the engines, barely managing to avoid a collision, but the planetoid's fast-orbiting debris punctures Sgt. Fodor's spacesuit, killing him instantly. After a religious service in space, Fodor's body is cast adrift into the void.

Eight months later, the general is becoming increasingly mentally unbalanced, focusing on Sgt. Fodor's loss as "God's judgement". On the Mars landing approach, he attempts to crash their spaceship, now convinced the mission violates the laws of God. Barney wrests control away from his father, landing the large flying wing glider-rocket safely. Later, as the crew takes its first steps on Mars, its members look up and see water pouring down from the now vertical return rocket. Barney quickly discovers the leak is sabotage caused by his father, who threatens his son with a .45 semiautomatic. The two struggle and the pistol discharges, killing the general. Sgt. Mahoney, who observed only the last stages of the struggle, wants Barney confined under arrest with the threat of court martial, but cooler heads prevail; Barney becomes the ranking officer.

After burying the general in a simple funeral, sergeant Imoto plants some flower seeds at the foot of the grave to see if they will grow in Martian soil.

Mars proves to be inhospitable, and they struggle to survive with their decreased water supply. Earth's correct orbital position for a return trip is one year away. While glumly celebrating their first Christmas on Mars, a sudden snowstorm blows in, allowing them to replenish their water supply. As their launch window arrives, sergeant Imoto finds that the flower seeds he had planted nearly a year before have taken root and started growing above the surface. He calls the others to see this. At that moment they hear low rumbling sounds, then see rocks falling, and feel the ground shake violently. The ground level shifts during this violent marsquake. Their spaceship is now leaning at a precarious angle and cannot make an emergency blast off. To right the spaceship, the crew uses the rocket engines' powerful thrust to shift the ground under the landing legs. The attempt works and they blast off, the spaceship rising just as the Martian surface completely collapses.

Once in space, Barney and Mahoney reconcile. Impressed with Barney's heroism and leadership while on Mars, Mahoney concludes that pursuing Barney's court martial for his father's death would only impugn the general's reputation, tarnishing what previously had been a spotless military career. Better is the fiction that "the man who conquered space" died in the line of duty, sacrificing himself to save his crew.

== Cast ==
- Walter Brooke as Colonel/General Samuel T. Merritt
- Eric Fleming as Captain Barney Merritt
- Mickey Shaughnessy as Sgt. Mahoney
- Phil Foster as Sgt. Jackie Siegle
- William Redfield as Roy Cooper
- William Hopper as Dr. George Fenton
- Benson Fong as Sgt. Imoto
- Ross Martin as Sgt. Andre Fodor
- Vito Scotti as Sanella
- John Dennis as Donkersgoed
- Michael Fox as Elsbach
- Joan Shawlee as Rosie
- Iphigenie Castiglioni as Mrs. Fodor
- Rosemary Clooney (uncredited, performing "Ali Baba" from Here Come the Girls)
- Fred Essler as Assistant Station Announcer
- Dan Barton as Crewman
- Kei Thin Chung as Japanese Replacement
- Don Dunning as Replacement Soldier

== Production ==
The science and technology portrayed in Conquest of Space were intended to be as realistic as possible in depicting the first voyage to Mars. The film's theatrical release poster tagline reads: "See how it will happen ... in your lifetime!"

The title Conquest of Space is from the 1949 nonfiction book The Conquest of Space, written by Willy Ley and illustrated by Chesley Bonestell. George Pal had hired Bonestell to be a technical adviser on Destination Moon. This was a huge hit and Pal used Bonestell again on When Worlds Collide.

In May 1952, Pal announced he would make a film out of Conquest of Space. George Pal bought the book's film rights at the suggestion of Ley. Universal said it had a similar project, Space Island.

In June 1952, it was reported that Barré Lyndon, who wrote War of the Worlds for Pal, was working on a script. In January 1953 Philip Yordan was working on the script. The following month Byron Haskin was named as director and Wernher von Braun would be a technical adviser. James Hanlon did the final script.

Bonestell, noted for his photorealistic paintings showing views from outer space, worked on the film's space matte paintings. The production design of Conquest of Space was closely modeled on the technical concepts of Wernher von Braun and Bonestell's space paintings, which originally appeared in Collier's magazine and were reprinted in the 1952 Viking Press book Across the Space Frontier, edited by Cornelius Ryan.

The film also incorporated concepts from von Braun's 1952 book The Mars Project, as well as material appearing in the April 30, 1954, issue of Collier's magazine, "Can we get to Mars?" by von Braun, with Cornelius Ryan. This would later be incorporated into the 1956 Viking Press book The Exploration of Mars by Willy Ley, Wernher von Braun, and Chesley Bonestell. All of these books mainly feature text that is straight popular science, with no fictional characters or story line. In addition, according to director Byron Haskin, "We had Wernher von Braun on the set all the time...as a technical advisor".

Although the budget was $1.5 million, George Pal and Paramount decided not to use stars. Walter Brooke turned down a five-year contract to appear in a soap opera to make the movie. Eric Fleming was pulled out of the cast of My Three Angels on Broadway to appear in the film. Filming started 16 November 1954.

== Reception ==
=== Critical response upon release ===
Judgments on the quality of the film's special effects have varied. Upon the film's release, reviewer Oscar A. Godbout in his review for The New York Times praised the effects, but was disparaging of the storyline, noting "... as plots go...it is not offensive".

=== Later critiques ===
Film authority Roy Kinnard says, “In examining the plethora of 1950s science-fiction movies which deal with the theme of man's journeying to other worlds in order to advance his own knowledge, George Pal’s production of Conquest of Space stands head and shoulders above the others.... [I]n a ... genre overburdened with cheap and shoddy productions that are all too deserving of scorn, Conquest of Space rises above the tide of mediocrity. ... [T]he special visual effects in Conquest ... are outstanding for their time ... and they are the well-tailored work of one of Hollywood’s most gifted craftsmen, John P. Fulton. Besides the massive, graceful spacecraft shown in this film, it was Fulton who was responsible for parting the Red Sea in the 1956 version of The Ten Commandments. ... It is true that the blue screen mattes in Conquest are crude [from our perspective] ... but this is hardly a technical flaw unique to this picture. Many productions of the ’50s had difficulty with blue screen work, even multi-million-dollar spectaculars like Ben-Hur”. Furthermore, science fiction film authority Thomas Kent Miller states, "Blue screen was used extensively in this epic [The Ten Commandments], and the blue line fringes are always quite evident throughout the movie. In fact, Fulton’s remarkable and iconic Parting of the Red Sea sequence is a great hodgepodge of intersecting blue fringe lines".

British film critic John Baxter, in his 1970 volume, Science Fiction in the Cinema, states, “Conquest of Space ... gave [George] Pal and [Byron] Haskin an excuse to show realistic take-offs, space maneuverings, and a landing on Mars ... achieved with some flair. Drama in the shape of a religious maniac at the helm detracts little from the essential narrative, and some of the detail is clever, such as the space burial with the suited corpse sliding slowly on a long fall into the sun".

Modern audiences are apt to notice the presence of matte lines. Reviewer Glenn Erickson said that "the ambitious special effects were some of the first to garner jeers for their lack of realism". Erickson correctly assesses the film as "a flop that seriously hindered George Pal's career as a producer". Paul Brenner said, "Pal pulls out all stops in the special effects department, creating the Wheel, rocket launches into space, and a breathtaking near-collision with an asteroid". The Encyclopedia of Science Fiction said "The special effects are quite ambitious but clumsily executed, in particular the matte work". Paul Corupe said that often "the overall image on screen that inspires awe: the Martian landscape, the general's high-tech office, and the vastness of the cosmos. The film's budget is certainly up on screen for your entertainment, but it's just spectacle for spectacle's sake". He, too, complains of matte lines, but acknowledges, "the composites are convincing enough for the time the film was made". Corupe described it as the "first big flop in Pal's career. It was a major setback that saw him abandon science fiction filmmaking for five years, including a planned sequel to When Worlds Collide" The Encyclopedia of Science Fiction remarks "A truly awful film, Conquest of Space is probably George Pal's worst production".

Academy Award winner Dennis Muren offers a memory of 1955: “[M]y pal Bruce and I hurried into the Hawaii Theatre on Hollywood Boulevard to see a new color movie, Conquest of Space. We were eight years old. ... ‘Reeling’ by on the giant screen, we saw a giant circular space station in orbit one hundred [sic] miles up, seemingly in orbit above me over Hollywood. Wow! And that was just the beginning. Awesome rocket ships of various shapes flew about. ... Finally, the movie ended with a skillful . . . and joyful liftoff from the desolate red surface of Mars. ...”

The film review aggregator website Rotten Tomatoes currently rates the film at 50% ("Rotten").

=== Possible impact on Kubrick and 2001: A Space Odyssey ===
Approximately ten years following the 1955 release of Conquest of Space, the film director Stanley Kubrick began planning his next film project following his critical and popular hit Dr. Strangelove or: How I Learned to Stop Worrying and Love the Bomb. The follow-up would become 1968's 2001: A Space Odyssey. While Kubrick planned his space epic, he made a point of viewing virtually all science-fiction movies to understand what the genre had done before, and also to learn which tropes to avoid.

Principally, Kubrick was on the lookout for particular and specific images and themes that referenced or reflected the infinity of space—its inherent magic and beauty—in other words, its ability to spark a sense of wonder. Of the myriad early science-fiction productions that Kubrick must have viewed, most were certainly earthbound B-movies that shied away from the sorts of expensive special visual effects and matte paintings that would ordinarily inspire awe or wonder in casual audiences. Kubrick’s goal was to create a space tale that was thought-provoking and that included numerous images that were truly awesome (in the proper sense of the word); thus, it was his intention “to pull out all the stops”.

According to genre film authority James Roman in his Bigger than Blockbusters: Movies that Defined America: “Articulating his vision about the infiniteness of space, Kubrick use[d] America’s Apollo space program as a means to embark from. [The program’s] goal was to land humans on the Moon and return them safely to earth. . . . [W]hile the American space program [clearly] influenced Kubrick's work, it did not provide him with the material he needed to visualize space travel and with the technology of the future. A 1955 film, George Pal’s Conquest of Space, provided Kubrick with a sense of direction in his . . . pursuit of this imagery. [For example,] in Pal’s film there is [the center-piece] rotating wheel or earth station that Kubrick adapts to 2001, and he creates a poetic image of it floating and rotating in space . . . .” The goal of this exercise of viewing dozens of earlier science-fiction movies had little to do with plot elements; Kubrick simply ignored Conquest of Space's highly-criticized story line and character development and instead focused on the film's remarkable design. He sought high-quality, well-crafted images that would stimulate himself and his creative staff to reach higher to find the look and design of his own film.

Furthermore, the genre film authority Roy Kinnard also suggests strongly in his 1979 Fantastic Films article, “Conquest of Space: A New Look at an Old Classic”, that the visually arousing design of Kubrick’s 2001 was influenced by Conquest of Space. He says, “...the most interesting aspect of Conquest [is] its startling parallels with Stanley Kubrick’s epic 1968 production. It is a well-known fact that before he began work on 2001, Kubrick watched virtually every science fiction film ever made, and it is not unreasonable to assume that he not only saw Conquest, but also found quite a bit of inspiration in it.” Then Kinnard points out a number of similarities between the two films (illustrated with photo stills from the movies)—some obvious and others not so obvious. For example, the same space station wheel in both pictures noted by Roman (above) as well as a number of set pieces.

Regarding Kinnard’s expression “quite a bit of inspiration”, insofar as the film’s two-minute title sequence was designed by Paramount’s consummate special visual effects professionals to stimulate our senses, especially sight and hearing, by concentrating evocative imagery of space and nebulae within the titles so as to induce an impression of “the infiniteness of space,” it may be that that sequence in part satisfied and fulfilled Kubrick’s requirements. It may be that a description of the scene may help some people visualize its expansiveness and expressiveness. Many things happen at the same time during the titles, which are cataloged here in footnote No.36.

Additionally, the frontispiece illustration to the introduction of Douglas Brode’s 2015 Fantastic Planets, Forbidden Zones, and Lost Continents shows a photo still of an astronaut floating in space from Conquest juxtaposed with an equivalent image from 2001 and bears the caption: “The highest form of flattery: As in other genres, science fiction filmmakers often include homages to earlier works. An ultra-realistic image of likely future travel from George Pal’s Conquest of Space (1955) would be almost precisely referenced in Stanley Kubrick’s 2001: A Space Odyssey (1968).”

== See also ==
- List of American films of 1955
- List of films featuring space stations
- List of films set on Mars
