= Bonestell (crater) =

Crater on Mars

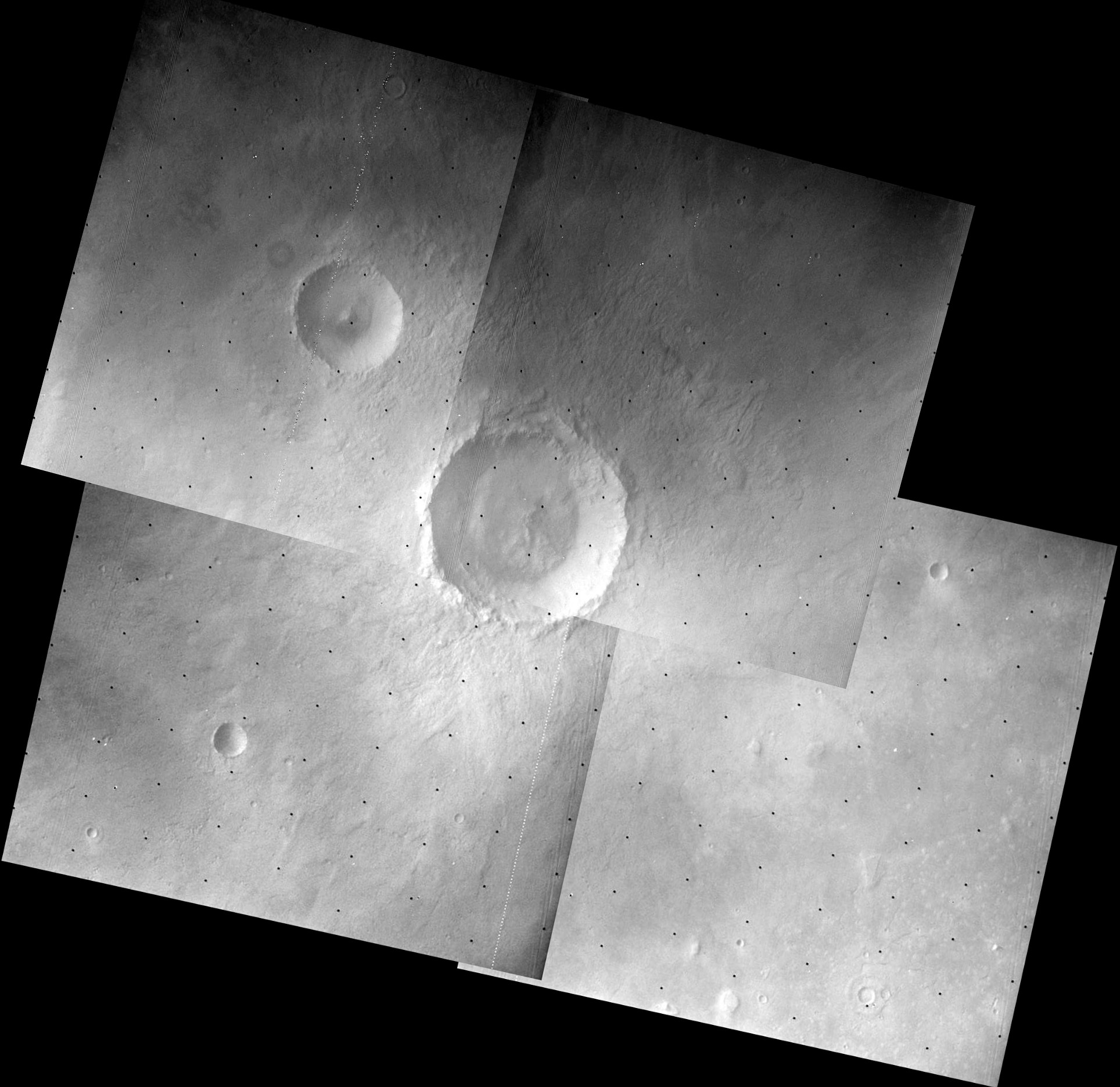
- Viking Orbiter 1 mosaic with Bonestell at center
- Planet: Mars
- Coordinates: 42.37°N 30.57°W
- Quadrangle: Mare Acidalium
- Diameter: 42.4 km (26.3 mi)
- Eponym: Chesley Bonestell, a famous American space artist (1888-1986)

Bonestell is an impact crater in the Northern hemisphere in the Mare Acidalium quadrangle of Mars, located at 42.37° North and 30.57° West. It is 42.4 km (26.3 mi) in diameter and was named after Chesley Bonestell, a famous American space artist (1888–1986), whose drawings inspired many young people to study sciences.

Bonestell has radially grooved ejecta, similar to Poona crater.

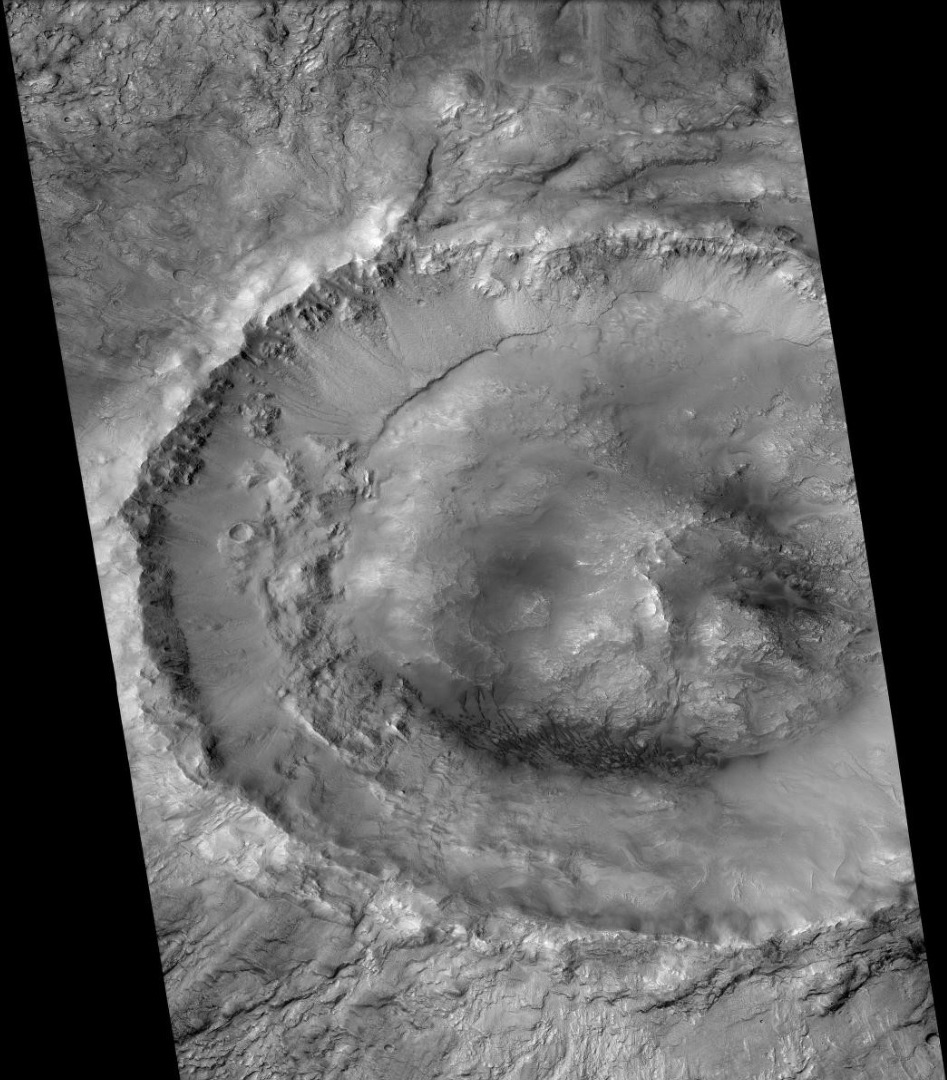
Bonestell crater, as seen by CTX camera (on MRO).

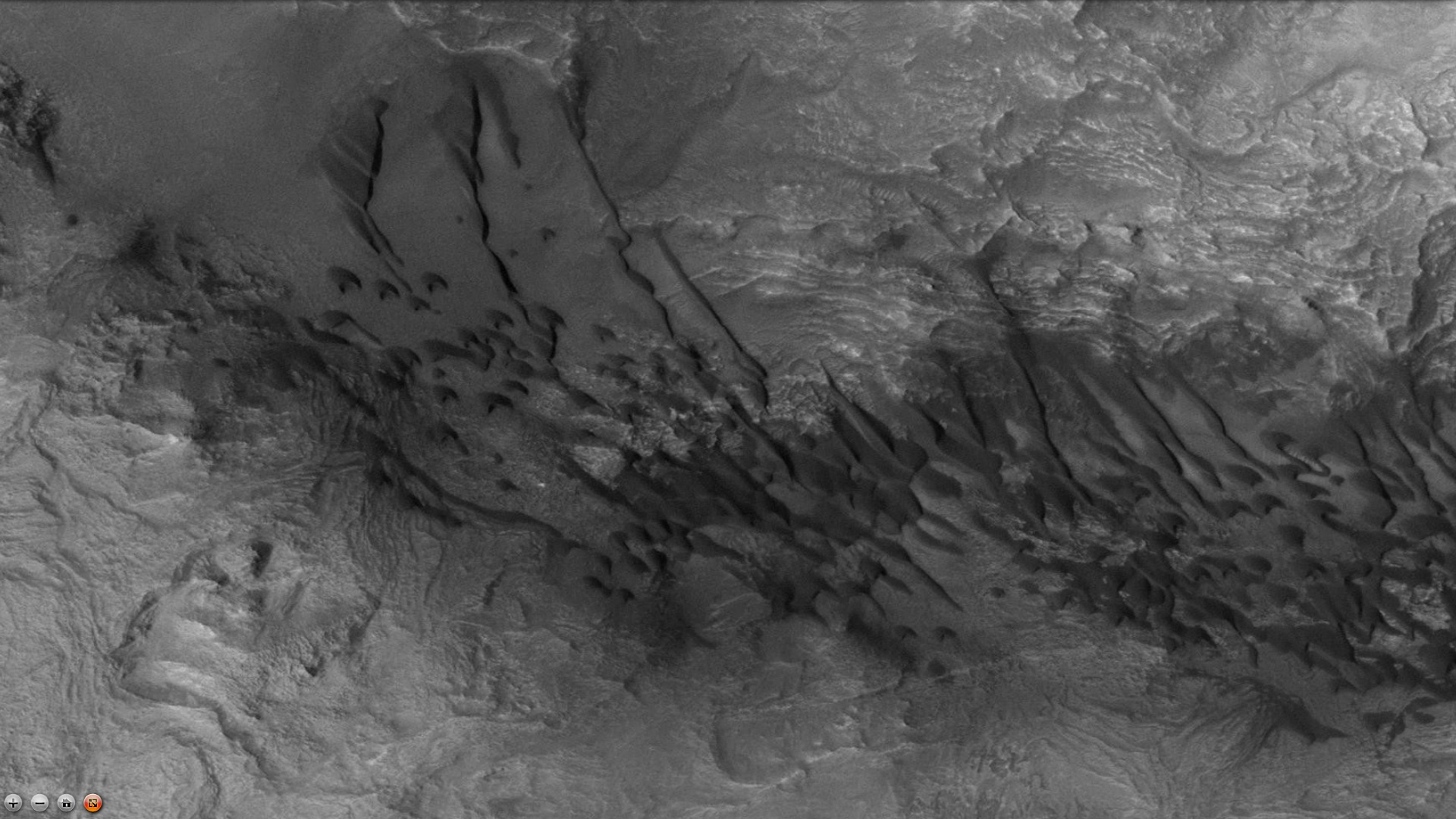
Field of dunes on floor of Bonestell crater, as seen by CTX camera. Note: this is an enlargement of the previous photo.

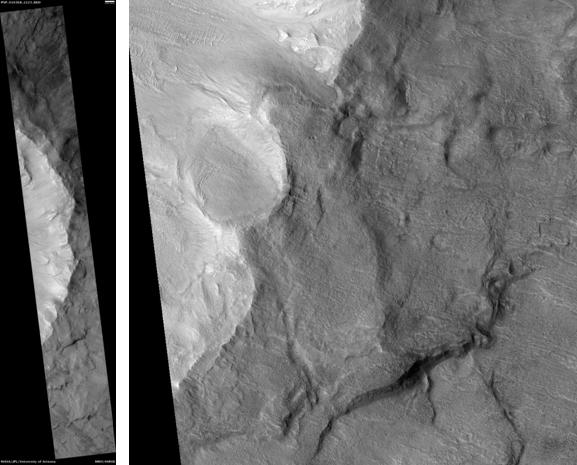
Bonestell, as seen by HiRISE. Scale bar is 1000 meters long.

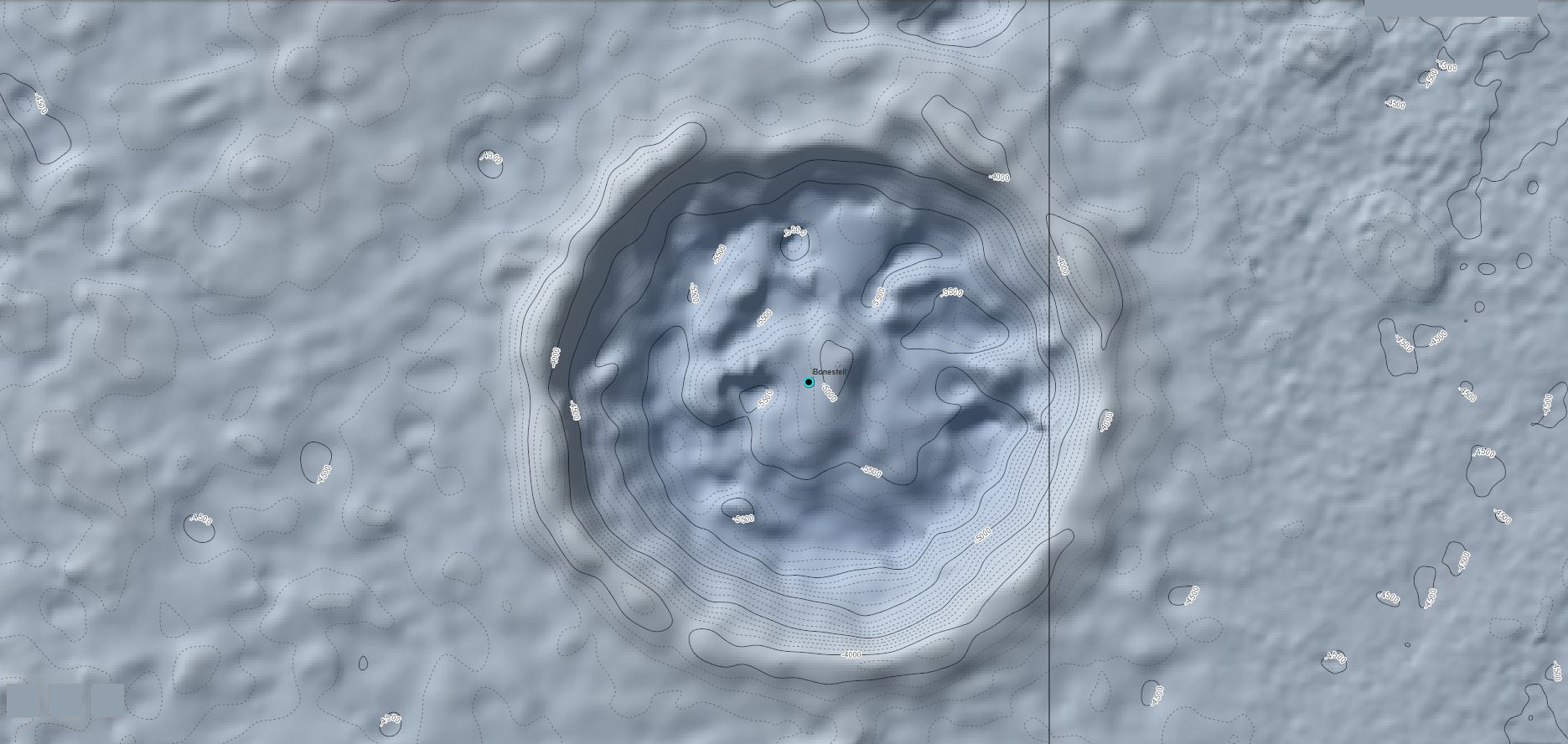
A topographic map illustrating the elevation of Bonestell crater.

== See also ==
- Impact crater
- Impact event
- List of craters on Mars
- Mare Acidalium quadrangle
- Ore resources on Mars
- Planetary nomenclature
