= Ruby Helder =

British opera singer

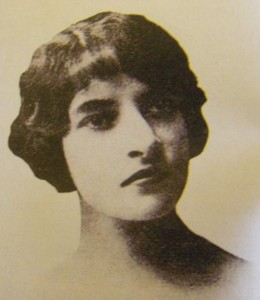
- Portrait of Ruby Helder as a young woman
- Born: March 3, 1890; Bristol, United Kingdom
- Died: November 21, 1938 (aged 48); Hollywood, Los Angeles, United States
- Education: Guildhall School of Music and Drama
- Occupation: Opera singer (contralto)
- Years active: 1908–1935
- Spouse: Chesley Bonestell (m. 1920)

Ruby Helder (March 3, 1890 – November 21, 1938) was a British opera singer known for her powerful contralto voice.

== Early life and family ==
Helder was born Emma Jane Holder in 1890 in the Easton district of Bristol. Her father, Thomas, a dairyman at the time, became landlord of a nearby public house where a young Helder would sing to entertain the regulars. Helder's vocal range—from C_{3} to C_{5}—attracted attention from an early age. She soon began formal music lessons, at which point she changed her name to avoid confusion with a classmate. Her aunt, who was housekeeper to the music hall star Harry Lauder, made arrangements for Helder to train at the Guildhall School of Music with Charles Tinney. Helder also later trained with Charles Santley.

Santley described her voice as a "natural, pure tenor voice of great beauty and power."

== Singing career and later life ==
By 1908, Helder was recording for Pathé, and in 1909 made her first appearance in an opera at the Queen's Hall, London. In 1911, she signed a recording contract with HMV, and by 1913 her international fame was such that she is said to have travelled to the United States in order to sing at a millionaire's private party. She sang at venues across the United States, and between 1916 and 1917 pursued music studies at Grinnell College. Helder later toured the United States and Canada with John Philip Sousa and his band.

On July 12, 1920, Helder married the American architect and artist Chesley Bonestell. The married couple then undertook a tour of Italy. At this point, however, Helder's popularity was in decline, and there were no recordings made of her after 1921, although she made her English radio debut on the BBC in January 1925. They returned to the United States in 1927, settling in Berkeley, California. She worked there as a music teacher for some years. Helder retired from singing in 1935, and died on November 21, 1938, aged just 48, at the Highland Hotel, Hollywood, after a long battle with alcoholism.

== Legacy ==
In June 2001 a commemorative plaque was unveiled at Helder's birthplace by Bristol’s Lord Mayor.

== Discography ==
- Girl Tenor. 2003. Pearl Records.
- Lily of Killarney. 1913. Columbia 5534. Columbia Records.
