= Von Braun ferry rocket =

Wernher von Braun rocket plan

Von Braun Ferry Rocket
Capacity

Payload to {{{to}}}

Launch history
- Status: Cancelled

stage

The von Braun ferry rocket was a concept design for a shuttle spacecraft that was developed by Wernher von Braun in a seminal series of early-1950s Collier's magazine articles, "Man Will Conquer Space Soon!" by Wernher von Braun et al. The ferry rocket concept has evolved over time.

== Re-creations ==
The ferry rocket is modeled in the following flight and spaceflight simulators:

- Orbiter, a freeware simulator by Martin Schweiger
- X-Plane

== See also ==
- "Man Will Conquer Space Soon"
- Reusable launch system
