= Exotic Zoology =

1959 book by Willy Ley

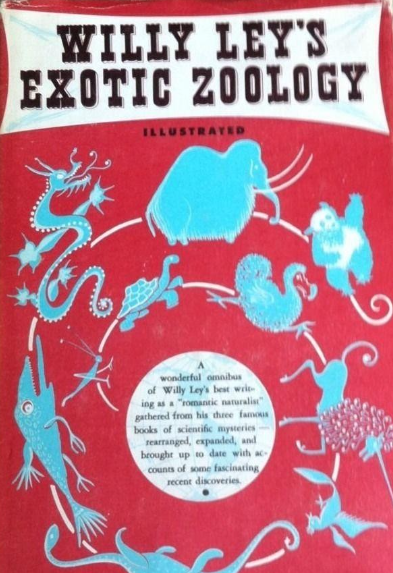
- Author: Willy Ley
- Illustrator: Olga Ley
- Publisher: Random House
- Publication date: 1959
- ISBN: 0-517-62545-8
- LC Class: 59-8356

Exotic Zoology is a 1959 cryptozoological book by Willy Ley, a science writer and space advocate. The illustrator of the book is Olga Ley.

== Content ==
Ley had written a number of books containing scientific oddities; Exotic Zoology collects the cryptozoological matter from those books. Throughout the book he shows examples of organisms that were rumored to exist, or were thought to be impossible, that were shown to be real; and others that were accepted as fact, that were discovered to have never existed: "He speculates about dragons and sea serpents, wingless birds and Abominable Snowmen." The book, in its description of (fictional) peoples and creatures, has been compared to John Mandeville's Travels. Some of the claims have been criticized or ridiculed, for instance the statement that giant squids had left scars on whales of two feet in diameter.

Exotic Zoology was not reviewed in many academic journals. An exception was a review in the Science journal, in 1959.
