= The Conquest of Space =

Book by Willy Ley

- Author: Willy Ley
- Illustrator: Chesley Bonestell
- Genre: Speculative science
- Publication date: 1949

The Conquest of Space is a 1949 speculative science book written by Willy Ley and illustrated by Chesley Bonestell. The book contains a portfolio of paintings by Bonestell depicting the possible future exploration of the Solar System, with explanatory text by Ley. Most of the 58 illustrations by Bonestell in Conquest, were previously published in color, in popular magazines.

== Influences on fiction ==
- Some of Bonestell's designs inspired the look of George Pal's 1955 science fiction movie Conquest of Space, which also takes its title from the book, but uses it as a framework on which to hang a melodramatic plot.
- Bonestell's illustrations of the Moon in The Conquest of Space were used by Hergé as a basis for his illustrations of the lunar surface in his 1952–53 The Adventures of Tintin comic, Explorers on the Moon.
- Arthur C. Clarke was also an admirer of The Conquest of Space; in his novel 2001: A Space Odyssey, Clarke refers to Saturn's moon Iapetus as "Japetus" due to that being the spelling used by Ley in The Conquest of Space.
- Larry Niven's 1967 short story "The Soft Weapon" is set on a planet around Beta Lyrae; Niven's description of Beta Lyrae is actually a meticulous retelling of the details of Bonestell's painting rather than any kind of portrayal of the Beta Lyrae system itself, which is now understood to look quite different.
