= Conquest of Space (TV series) =

- Genre: Science documentary
- Written by: Noel Moore
- Presented by: Percy Saltzman
- Narrated by: Bill Kehoe
- Country of origin: Canada
- Original language: English
- No. of seasons: 1
- No. of episodes: 5

Production
- Producer: Rod Holmes
- Production location: Ottawa
- Editor: Robert Murphy
- Running time: 60 minutes

Original release
- Network: CBC Television
- Release: 27 July – 31 August 1969

Conquest of Space is a Canadian science documentary television miniseries that aired on CBC Television in 1969.

== Premise ==
Percy Saltzman hosted this Ottawa-produced series which concerned the history of travel in outer space. Emphasis was given to the years since 1957 when the Soviet Union launched Sputnik 1 and covered the American space program whose Apollo 11 successfully placed astronauts on the moon a week before this series' debut. Footage from Britain, France, the Soviet Union and the United States was combined with interviews of scientists and engineers who were engaged in outer space programs.

== Scheduling ==
This hour-long series was broadcast on Sundays at 10:00 p.m. (Eastern) from 27 July to 31 August 1969.

== Episodes ==
- 27 July 1969: "Sounds of Silence"
- 3 August 1969: "The Other Side of the Sky"
- 10 August 1969: "The High Frontier"
- 17 August 1969: "A Star to Steer Her By"
- 31 August 1969: "Childhood's End"
