= Man Will Conquer Space Soon! =

Series of 1950s magazine articles

"Man Will Conquer Space Soon!" was the title of a series of 1950s magazine articles in Collier's detailing Wernher von Braun's plans for human spaceflight. Edited by Cornelius Ryan, the individual articles were authored by such space notables of the time as Willy Ley, Fred Lawrence Whipple, Dr. Joseph Kaplan, Dr. Heinz Haber, and von Braun. The articles were illustrated with paintings and drawings by Chesley Bonestell, Fred Freeman, and Rolf Klep, some of the finest magazine illustrators of the time.

The magazine articles showed earth orbit missions and lunar surface exploration, to be undertaken by large crews in the 1960/70s timeframe. Several concept vehicles were proposed and described in detail, such as a ferry rocket, a Space Station, and a Lunar Lander.

== Article details ==
The issues and titles of the articles in Collier's were:

March 22, 1952: "Man will Conquer Space Soon."

"What are we waiting for?" pp. 22–23.
"Crossing the last frontier." pp. 24–29, 72, 74. Dr. Wernher von Braun
"A station in space." pp. 30–31. Willy Ley
"The heavens open." p. 32–33. Dr. Fred L. Whipple
"This side of infinity." p. 34. Dr. Joseph Kaplan
"Can we survive in space?" pp. 35, 65–67. Dr. Heinz Haber
"Who owns the universe?" pp. 36, 70–71. Oscar Schachter
"Around the Editor's Desk: Space Quiz." pp. 38–39.

October 18, 1952: "Man on the Moon."

"Man on the Moon." p. 51. The editors
"The journey." pp. 52–58, 60. Dr. Wernher von Braun
"Inside the moon ship." p. 56–60. Willy Ley

October 25, 1952: "More about Man on the Moon."

"The exploration." pp. 38–40, 42, 44–48. Dr. Fred L. Whipple and Dr. Wernher von Braun
"Inside the lunar base." p. 46. Willy Ley

February 28, 1953: "World's First Space Suit."

"Man's survival in space." pp. 40–41. Cornelius Ryan and the editors
"Picking the men." pp. 42–48.

March 7, 1953: "More about Man's Survival in Space."

"Testing the men." pp. 56–63.

March 14, 1953: "How Man will Meet Emergency in Space Travel."

"Emergency!" pp. 38–44.

June 27, 1953: "The Baby Space Station: First Step in the Conquest of Space."

"Baby Space Station." pp. 33–35, 38, 40. Dr. Wernher von Braun with Cornelius Ryan

April 30, 1954: "Is There Life on Mars?"

"Is there life on Mars?" p. 21. Dr. Fred L. Whipple
"Can we get to Mars?" pp. 22–29. Dr. Wernher von Braun with Cornelius Ryan

== Legacy ==
The article series was the basis for three episodes in the Disneyland anthology series: "Man in Space," "Man and the Moon," and "Mars and Beyond." The series was expanded into three books: Across the Space Frontier (1952), Conquest of the Moon (1953), and The Exploration of Mars (1956). Examples of some of the ships they modeled are in the World of Collier's add-ons to the Orbiter space flight simulator.

== See also ==
- Von Braun ferry rocket
- A page-by-page, high resolution reprint (PDF format) starts in the July / August 2012 issue of the newsletter Horizons, and continues for a total of eight issues, published once every two months. Horizons is the newsletter of the Houston Section of the American Institute of Aeronautics and Astronautics. These are available to the public with no paywall and no membership required.
