= Sidney Perkowitz =

- Born: Brooklyn, New York, U.S.
- Scientific career
- Workplaces: Emory University

Sidney Perkowitz is a scientist and science writer. He is the Charles Howard Candler Professor Emeritus of Physics at Emory University, where he has pursued research on the properties of matter and has produced more than 100 scientific papers and books. He is a Fellow of the American Association for the Advancement of Science.

In 1990, Perkowitz's interests turned to presenting science to non-scientists via books and articles, the media, lectures, museum exhibits, and stage works. His popular science books Empire of Light, Universal Foam and Digital People have been translated into six languages and Braille. His book Hollywood Science was published in Fall 2007, and his latest volume, Slow Light: Invisibility, Teleportation, and Other Mysteries of Light, was published in 2011.

Perkowitz has also written for The Sciences, Technology Review, the Los Angeles Times, the Washington Post, Encyclopædia Britannica and others. Media appearances and lectures include CNN, NPR, the BBC, among others. He is the author of the performance-dance piece Albert and Isadora, and the plays Friedmann’s Balloon and Glory Enough, all produced on stage. He recently completed his first screenplay. He blogs about science for the National Academy of Sciences.

Sidney Perkowitz was born in Brooklyn, NY, and was educated at Polytechnic University, New York, and the University of Pennsylvania.

== Books ==
Slow Light (2011) is Perkowitz's fifth book of science nonfiction for popular audiences. Slow Light is a popular treatment of recent breakthroughs in the science of light. Even though the quantum mysteries of light are still not fully understood, it can be slowed to a stop and speeded up beyond its Einsteinian speed limit, 186,000 miles/sec; used for quantum telecommunications; teleported; manipulated to create invisibility; and perhaps used to generate hydrogen fusion power.

Hollywood Science (2007) discusses the portrayal of science in more than one hundred films, including science fiction, scientific biographies, and documentaries. Beginning with early films like A Trip to the Moon and Metropolis and concluding with more recent offerings like The Matrix, War of the Worlds, A Beautiful Mind, and An Inconvenient Truth, Perkowitz questions how much faith can be put into Hollywood's depiction of scientists and their work; how accurately these films capture scientific fact and theory; whether cataclysms like the earth's collision with a comet can actually happen; and to what extent these films influence public opinion about science and the future. The book features dozens of film stills and a list of the all-time best and worst science-fiction movies.

Digital People: From Bionic Humans to Androids (2005) recounts the history of humankind's fascination with creating thinking beings from inanimate objects. Ancient Greek mythology tells of the god Hephaestus who was lame and created winged servants to assist him, while Mary Shelley’s 1818 novel Frankenstein; or, The Modern Prometheus tells of reanimating dead body parts into something that resembles a living human being (these are two examples of many given by Perkowitz). The term “robot” was first used in Karl Capek’s 1921 play R.U.R., but soon it was a standard term used everywhere to describe these fictional machines and their real-life counterparts.

Universal Foam (2001) exposes the full dimensions of foam in human life, from cappuccino to the cosmos. Foam affects the taste of beer, makes shaving easier, insulates take-out coffee cups and NASA Space Shuttles, controls bleeding in trauma victims, aids in drilling for oil, and captures dust particles from comets. The foam of ocean whitecaps affects Earth's climate, and astronomers believe the billions of galaxies that make up the universe rest on surfaces of immense bubbles within a gargantuan foam.

Empire of Light (1996) discusses the nature of light, how the eye sees, and how human understanding of these phenomena have emerged over the ages, including the role of light in the development of quantum physics. Perkowitz examines the making of electrical light and its integration into commerce, telecommunications, entertainment, medicine, warfare, and every other aspect of daily life. And he presents the role of light in the search for the beginning and the end of the universe, as astronomers with their instruments penetrate ever deeper into the sky. His examinations range from the cave paintings at Lascaux to Mark Rothko’s stark blocks of color in today’s art museums, from Plato’s speculation that the eye sends out rays to Ramon y Cajal’s modern analysis of the visual system, from Tycho Brahe’s elegant measurements of planetary positions to the Hubble telescope’s exquisite sensitivity to light from billions of light years away.

== Articles ==
Sidney Perkowitz has written nearly 100 articles, essays, and book chapters on science for popular audiences, including children. In addition to the major media outlets referenced above, publications in which his works have appeared include The Miami Herald, The Manchester Guardian, San Jose Mercury, Houston Chronicle, Atlanta Journal-Constitution, Literal, The Bridge, The Scientist, New Scientist, The Times, Odyssey, and more. His work has also appeared in national journals, including Denver Quarterly, The American Prospect, Art Papers, and Leonardo Journal, and in books such as The Metaphorical Circuit (1983). His topics include popular science, the humor and culture of science, science on stage and screen, science and art, science and mythology, the literature of technology, and contemporary artists who use scientific ideas.

== Critical reception ==
Perkowitz's science books for general audiences have generally received positive reviews in national publications. A reviewer for the Scientific American Book Club described Slow Light as offering “insights from the cutting edge of physics.” David Schneider of American Scientist described Hollywood Science as “Great fun,” noting that it brings lesser-known films to readers' attention and examines how such films can educate the public and inspire interest in scientific research.

Beth Kephart of the Pennsylvania Gazette wrote that Digital People is "A helpful book a straightforward summarization of the myth and magic, science and struggles, ideals and cautions that constitute the history of artificial beings.” Science Magazine called Universal Foam “Broad-ranging and enlightening.”, and Publishers Weekly and Kirkus Reviews both praised Empire of Light as “A wondrous, mind-expanding tour of the visible world" and as “Smoothly written, comprehensive, and thoroughly enjoyable," respectively.
