= Willy Ley =

German and American writer (1906–1969)

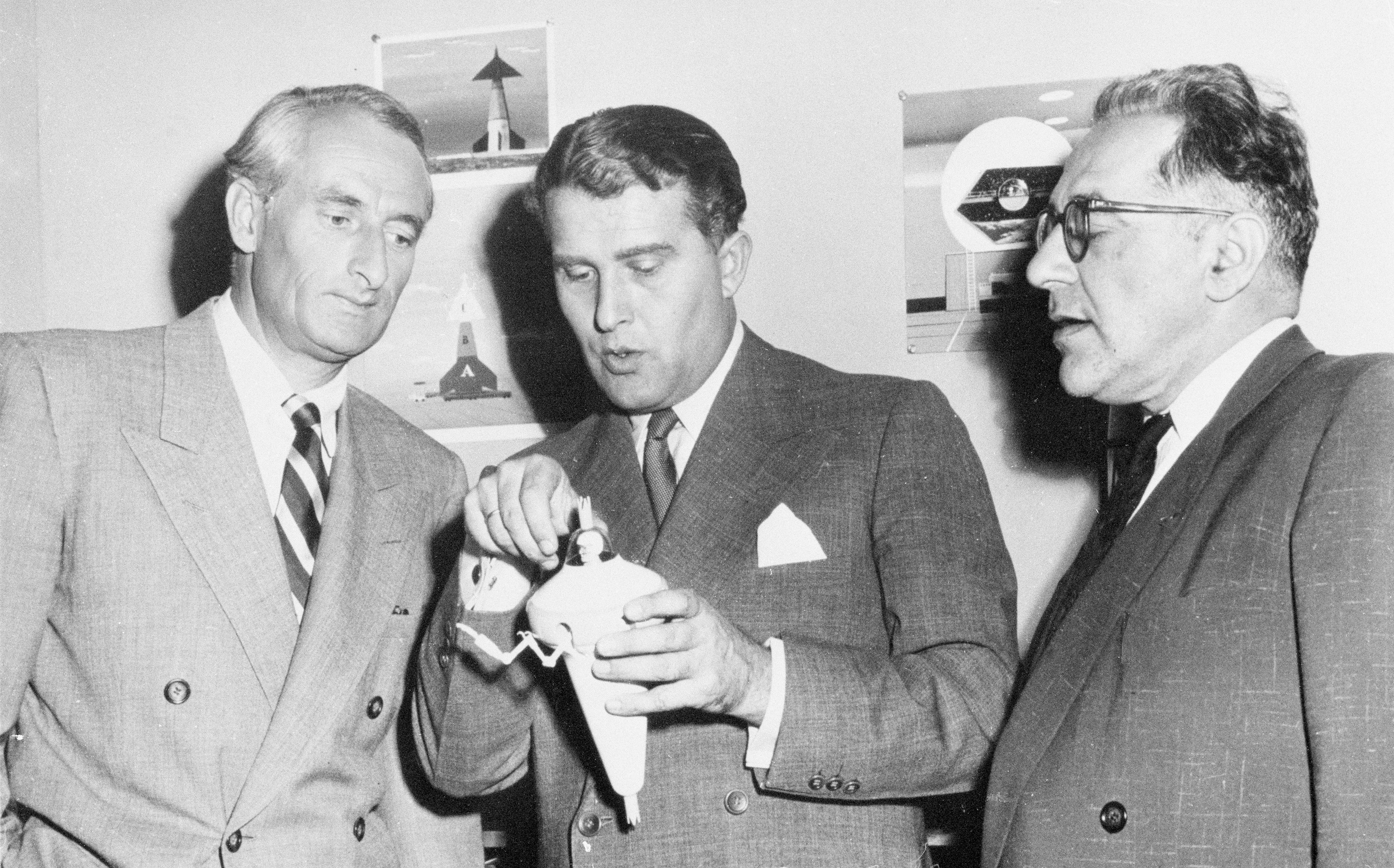
- (left to right) Heinz Haber, Wernher von Braun, Willy Ley
- Born: Willy Otto Oskar Ley; October 2, 1906; Berlin, German Empire
- Died: June 24, 1969 (aged 62); Jackson Heights, New York City, US
- Other name: Robert Wiley
- Occupations: science writer and historian of science
- Spouse: Olga
- Children: daughters Sandra and Xenia

Notes
- US citizen (1944); Worldcon Guest of Honor (1953)

Willy Otto Oskar Ley (born Willy Otto Oskar May; 2 October 1906 – 24 June 1969) was a German and American science writer and proponent of space exploration and cryptozoology. Originally registered at the Landesarchiv Berlin under his mother's surname (register entry no. 2453), he was legally legitimized under German civil law and took his father's surname following the marriage of his parents, Otto Julius Ley and Charlotte Wilhelmine Frida May, on 20 March 1909. The crater Ley on the far side of the Moon is named in his honor.

== Early life and Berlin years ==
Following the outbreak of World War I, International Committee of the Red Cross records document that his father—a reserve Leutnant (lieutenant) in Infanterie-Regiment Nr. 15 (2nd Westphalian Infantry Regiment) who was working for the German newspaper Süd-Afrika Zeitung in Johannesburg—was detained by British authorities in South Africa on 25 August 1914 (file no. 5631 / 5787/C) before being transferred to the United Kingdom in May 1915 and interned at Knockaloe camp on the Isle of Man for the remainder of the war.

As Ley later recalled he "grew up, so to speak, in the shadow of the Museum of Natural History in Berlin". When his school teacher asked him to compose an essay on the subject "What Do I Want to Be When I Am Grown and Why?", Ley responded: "I want to be an explorer."

At the University of Berlin, he studied astronomy, physics, zoology, and paleontology. Ley explained, "I was never quite sure whether my studies would earn me the title of 'zoologist' or 'geologist', but I kept exploring, in a manner of speaking, looking especially into such corners as others had neglected." He then became interested in spaceflight after reading Hermann Oberth's book Die Rakete zu den Planetenräumen (The Rocket into Interplanetary Space). Although it was a difficult technical book, Ley worked through the calculations and concluded that outer space would soon become the next great frontier of human exploration.

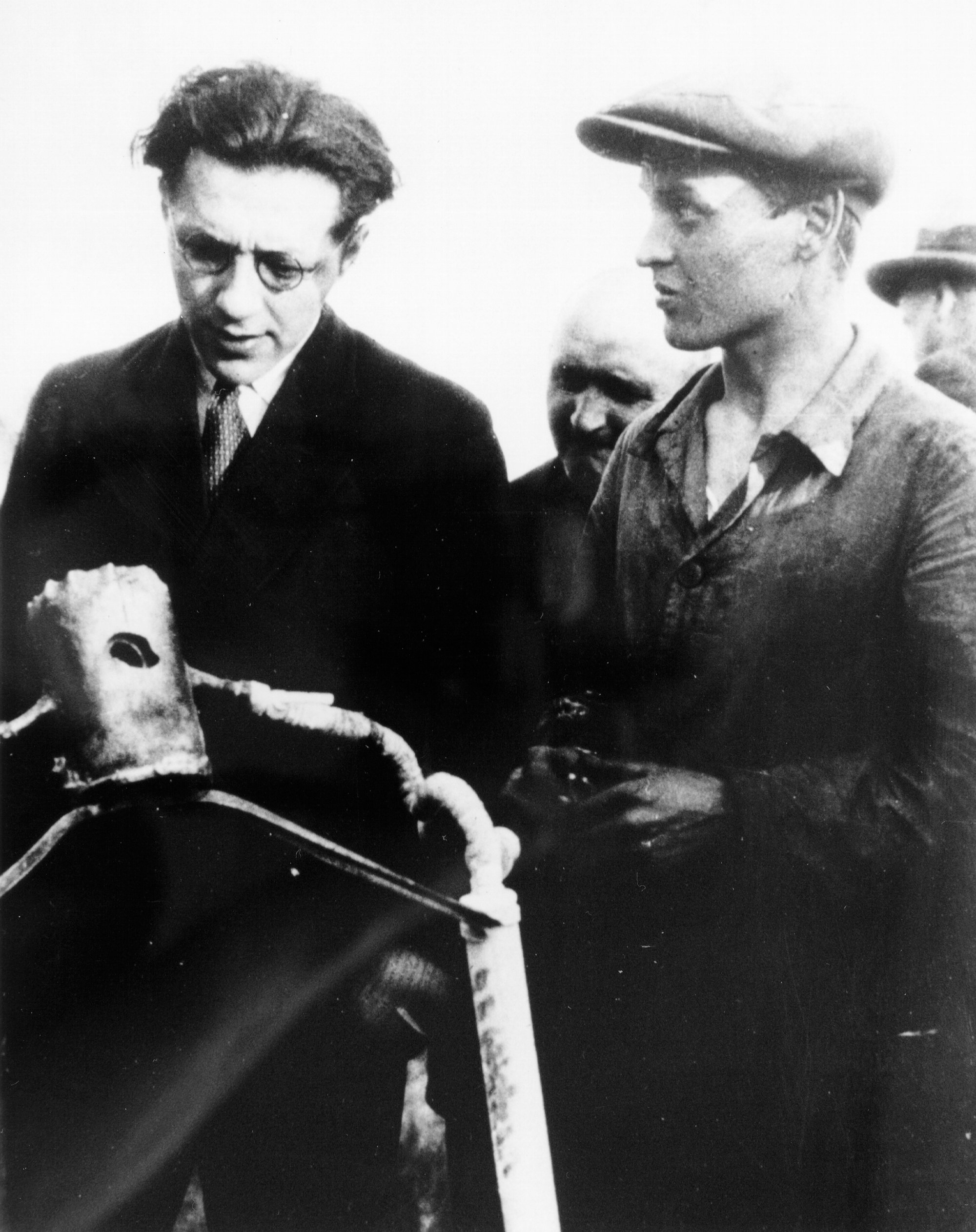
Willy Ley (left) with Paul Ehmayr with the Repulsor I rocket for the Verein für Raumschiffahrt in Germany in 1931

According to surviving Berlin Document Center records, Ley joined the Nazi Party (NSDAP, membership card no. 11664) on 29 July 1925 while residing at Scharnhorststraße 24 in Berlin, and remained a member until 15 October 1928. His father, Otto Julius Ley, later joined the NSDAP on 1 May 1933 and remained a member until his death in Dresden in May 1945.

Ley was so convinced by Oberth's book that he sat down at the age of 19 to write a popularization of its contents. He also began corresponding with every known rocket enthusiast in Europe, including Oberth himself. After publishing Die Fahrt ins Weltall (Travel in Outer Space) in 1926, Ley became one of the first members of Germany's amateur rocket group, the Verein für Raumschiffahrt (VfR – "Spaceflight Society") in 1927 and wrote extensively for its journal, Die Rakete (The Rocket). Ley would eventually become the group's vice-president during a time when it had no active President. Meanwhile, he was writing hundreds of short articles about rockets for German and foreign newspapers.

Due to the influence of Ley and other popular science writers, such as Max Valier, Germans witnessed a short-lived "rocketry fad" in Berlin. From exhibits at public locations to large spectator events, such as Fritz von Opel's rocket-car stunts, the German public was excited about both the future possibilities of space travel and the potential for new "weapons of wonder" that could revive the German Empire.

The "rocketry fad" culminated with Fritz Lang's 1929 film Die Frau im Mond (Woman in the Moon), which became the first realistic depiction of spaceflight in cinematic history. Although Oberth is often credited as the main technical consultant to the film, Ley's role was of central importance. Oberth was tasked with building a small rocket to be launched at the film's premiere. This project never materialized. However, Ley's work on the movie did. As director Fritz Lang later recalled, "The work he had done as consultant and advisor ... was amazing. The models of the spaceship, really a highly advanced model of a rocket, the trajectories and the orbits of the modular capsule from the earth, around the earth and to the moon and back ... were so accurate that in 1937 the Gestapo confiscated not only all models of the spaceship but also all foreign prints of the picture."

Despite the many successes the "rocketry fad" could not be sustained during the early years of the Great Depression. The German public lost interest amidst economic turmoil. Meanwhile, some rocket researchers formed closer ties with the military, which greatly expanded under the leadership of Wernher von Braun. With the collapse of the VfR, the rise of a culture of necessary secrecy and the loss of public enthusiasm, Ley grew discouraged. He continued to write articles for the domestic and foreign press while he stayed in touch with close friends. Yet for the most part, Ley turned back to his original scientific interests, while writing a biography of Conrad Gessner (the "father" of modern zoology). To make ends meet, Ley also worked as a clerk and then manager at a Berlin bank.

When the Nazis seized power, Ley's situation became increasingly desperate. He was horrified by National Socialism, its ideology and its style of violent politics. His perception of political events can be inferred from a short science fiction story "Fog", which Ley wrote in 1940 under the pen name of Robert Wiley. It is a biographical narrative about an office manager dealing with the everyday effects of totalitarianism. Although the story is set in New York City during a failed Communist revolution, it is clear that Ley is retelling his personal experiences in Berlin. In fact, John Campbell, the editor of Astounding Stories, requested that Ley center the narrative on his personal experience. Ley not only disliked the irrational nature of German politics, but he also associated the Nazis with the rise of "Pseudo-science". Ley had an established reputation as an international scientist, who openly shared and popularized technical information about rocketry, while his articles continued to be republished by foreign newspapers throughout 1934.

In January 1935, Ley used company stationery to write a letter that authorized his vacation in London. Carrying only his favorite books, a few changes of clothing and travel documentation, Ley fled Germany for the United Kingdom and ultimately the United States.

== In the United States ==
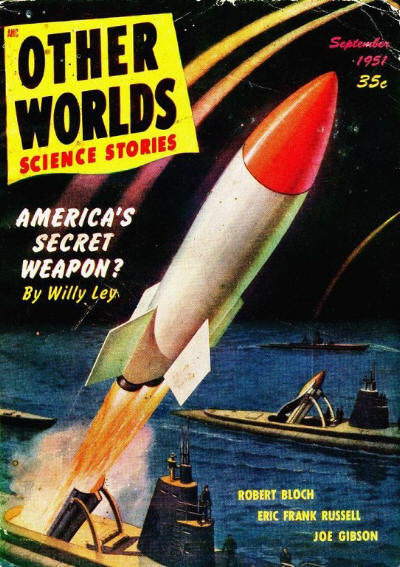
Ley contributed non-fiction pieces to several American science fiction magazines, including Other Worlds

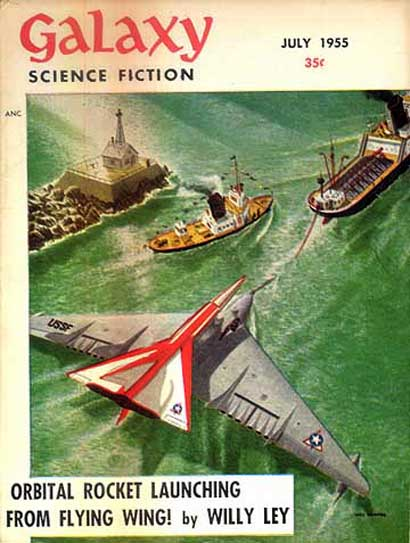
One of Ley's regular science columns took the cover of the July 1955 issue of Galaxy

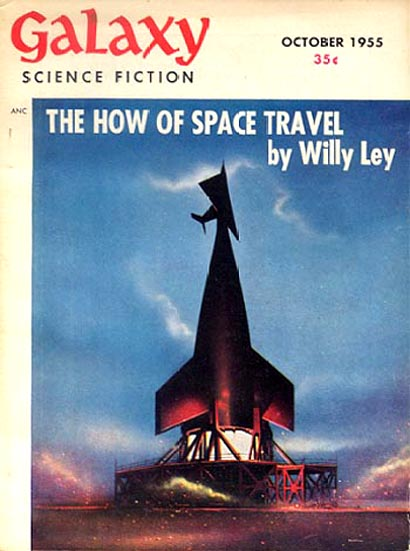
Another Ley science column was cover-featured on the October 1955 Galaxy

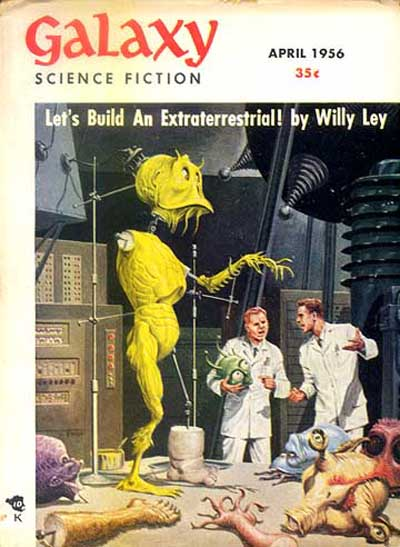
Ley's "Let's Build an Extraterrestrial!" took the cover of the April 1956, issue of Galaxy, illustrated by Ed Emshwiller

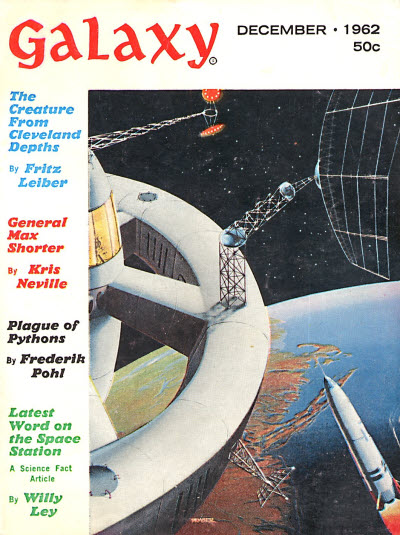
Ley's "Are We Going to Build a Space Station?" was cover-featured on the December 1962 issue of Galaxy

In 1936, he supervised operations of two rocket planes carrying mail at Greenwood Lake, New York. Ley was an avid reader of science fiction, and began publishing scientific articles in American science fiction magazines, beginning with "The Dawn of the Conquest of Space" in the March 1937 issue of Astounding Stories. In the magazine's February 1937 issue, he had published a science fiction short story "At the Perihelion" under the pseudonym Robert Wiley, which was later reprinted as "A Martian Adventure" in the 1962 anthology Great Science Fiction by Scientists (Collier Books, Groff Conklin, ed.). He was a member of science fiction fandom as well, attending science fiction conventions, and was eventually a Guest of Honor at Philcon II, the 1953 World Science Fiction Convention.

In 1940 Ley joined the staff of PM. In the winter of 1941 he met the paper's fitness columnist and model, Olga Feldmann (1912–2001). They became engaged on December 11 and married on Christmas Eve.

In the 1950s, Ley collaborated closely with former Peenemünde engineers brought to the United States under Operation Paperclip, including Wernher von Braun and Hermann Oberth, co-authoring several books and consulting on spaceflight media. Historians have noted that Ley's postwar histories portrayed the German rocket team purely as apolitical space pioneers, omitting their NSDAP and SS affiliations as well as the use of concentration camp forced labor at Mittelwerk.

His book Rockets – the Future of Travel Beyond the Stratosphere (1944) describes the early rockets at VfR and more futuristic projects to reach the moon using a 3-stage rocket "as high as 1/3 of the Empire State Building" — a very good estimate of the height of the Saturn V rocket designed 20 years later. His works from the 1940s, 50s and '60s are regarded as classics of popular science and include The Conquest of Space 1949 (with Chesley Bonestell), The Conquest of the Moon (with Wernher von Braun and Fred Whipple, 1953), and Beyond the Solar System (1964). His book, Rockets, Missiles, and Space Travel, (1957) was cited in the Space Handbook: Astronautics and its Applications, a staff report of the Select Committee on Astronautics and Space Exploration of the U.S. House of Representatives, which provided non-technical information about spaceflight to U.S. policy makers.

Ley had a regular science column called "For Your Information" in Galaxy Science Fiction from March 1952 until his death. Ley participated in "Man in Space", a 1955 episode of Disneyland which explained spaceflight to a large television audience. Fellow Galaxy columnist Floyd C. Gale wrote that Ley "has become as familiar to TV audiences as Howdy Doody".

In the late 1950s, he designed for Monogram models a range of space vehicles. The kits included informational booklets on space travel written by Ley. He also consulted for the Tom Corbett, Space Cadet series of children's science fiction books and TV series, as well as the 1959 feature film entitled The Space Explorers. Robert A. Heinlein honored him by mentioning a future "Leyport" on the Moon in his 1952 juvenile novel The Rolling Stones. Likewise and long after his death, Larry Niven and Steven Barnes named a future Space Shuttle the “Willy Ley” in their 1982 novel The Descent of Anansi.

In 1954, Ley wrote Engineers' Dreams in which he discussed 'Seven Future Wonders of the World'. These included accurate predictions of the Channel Tunnel between Britain and France and commercial wind, solar and geothermal power. Other schemes were less practical: damming the River Jordan to provide power and irrigation to Israel/Palestine and the plans of fellow German Herman Sörgel to drain the Mediterranean to link Europe with Africa and create the new continent of Atlantropa.

He was a member of the all-male literary banqueting club the Trap Door Spiders, which served as the basis of Isaac Asimov's fictional group of mystery solvers the Black Widowers.

Ley died of a heart attack on June 24, 1969, at the age of 62 – less than a month before men first landed on the Moon – in his home in Jackson Heights, Queens, where he had lived with his family since the mid-1950s.

In 2025, Ley's ashes were found in a labeled crematorium tin in the basement of an apartment building on West 67th Street on Manhattan's Upper West Side. A New York Times article, published on April 21, 2025, stated that there was no record of "anyone named Ley ever having lived in the building." But one of the readers' comments (posted under the initials ″MMP″ beneath the web version of the article) shared the following, which might explain how the ashes ended up there: "Until my divorce from [Willy Ley's] daughter Xenia, he was my father-in-law: and the grandfather of my late daughter Christiana.... His wife Olga had an apartment in the building until her death." According to a New York Times obituary notice, Olga Ley died in 2001. Other sources confirm that Xenia's ex-husband indeed was named Martin Parker (perhaps as in ″MMP″).

Efforts continue to find a final resting place for the remains. Many of Willy Ley's supporters hope eventually to launch his ashes into space and perhaps, if the opportunity ever presents itself, scatter them on the moon.

== Cryptozoology ==
Ley was best known for his books on rocketry and related topics, but he also wrote a number of books about cryptozoology, a pseudoscience. In 1949, Ley published an article "Do Prehistoric Monsters Still Exist?" which popularised the living dinosaur idea and included a discussion on the Mokele-mbembe legend. Ley collected much source material on anomalous animals for his writings. Science historian Brian Regal has noted that Ley "copied entire chapters of Heuvelmans's On the Track of Unknown Animals for his own reference."

== Bibliography ==
- Die Fahrt ins Weltall. Hachmeister & Thal. 1926.
- Das Drachenbuch: Plaudereien von Echsen, Lurchen und Vorweltsaurien. Theringer Verlags-Anstalt/H. Bartholomaeus. 1927.
- Mars der Kriegsplanet. Hachmeister & Thal. 1927.
- Eiszeit. Theringer Verlags-Anstalt/H. Bartholomaeus. 1927.
- Die Möglichkeit der Weltraumfahrt, (ed.). Hachmeister & Thal. 1928.
- Konrad Gessner: Leben und Werk. Muenchner Drucke. 1929.
- Grundriss einer Geschichte der Rakete. Hachmeister & Thal. 1932.
- Luftschutz-ABC. Hachmeister & Thal. 1934.
- The Lungfish and the Unicorn: An Excursion into Romantic Zoology. Modern Age Books. 1941.
- The Days of Creation: A Biography of Our Planet. Modern Age Books. 1941.
- Bombs and Bombing. Modern Age Books. 1941.
- Shells and Shooting. Modern Age Books. 1942.
- Rockets: The Future of Travel Beyond the Stratosphere. Viking Press. 1944.
- The Lungfish, the Dodo, & the Unicorn: An Excursion Into Romantic Zoology (expanded edition of The Lungfish and the Unicorn). Viking Press. 1948.
- (with Chesley Bonestell) (1949). The Conquest of Space.
- Dragons in Amber: Further Adventures of a Romantic Naturalist. Sidgwick & Jackson. 1951.
- (with L. Sprague de Camp) (1952). Lands Beyond. Rinehart & Company.
- (with Wernher von Braun; et al. (1953). The Complete Book of Outer Space. Maco Magazine Corporation.
- (with Wernher von Braun; Fred Lawrence Whipple) (1953) [1952 – Collier's, "Man on the Moon"]. Cornelius Ryan (ed.). Conquest of the Moon. illustrated by Chesley Bonestell, Fred Freeman, Rolf Klep. New York: The Viking Press.
- Engineers' Dreams. Viking Press. 1954.
- Salamanders and other Wonders. Viking Press. 1955.
- (with Wernher von Braun) (1956). The Exploration of Mars. Viking Press.
- Adventure in Space: Space Pilots. Guild Press. 1957.
- Man-Made Satellites. Guild Press. 1957.
- Space Pilots. Guild Press. 1957.
- (with Wernher von Braun) (1957). The Complete Book of Satellites and Outer Space (2nd ed.). Maco Magazine Corporation.
- Adventure in Space: Space Stations. Guild Press. 1958.
- Adventure in Space: Space Travel. Guild Press. 1958.
- Satellites, Rockets and Outer Space. New American Library. 1958.
- Rockets, Missiles and Space Travel. New York: The Viking Press. 1958.
- Willy Ley's Exotic Zoology. Random House. 1987 [1959]. ISBN 0-517-62545-8.
- Mars and Beyond: A Tomorrowland Adventure. L.W. Singer. 1959 [adapted for school use by Willy Ley].
- Tomorrow the Moon: A Tomorrowland Adventure. L.W. Singer. 1959 [adapted for school use by Willy Ley].
- Rockets (published lectures). Doubleday. 1960.
- Ballistics. Nelson Doubleday. 1961.
- Planets. Nelson Doubleday. 1961.
- The Poles. LIFE Nature Library. 1962.
- Harnessing Space. New York: MacMillan. 1963. p. 314.
- Watchers of the Sky: An Informal History of Astronomy From Babylon to the Space Age. Viking Press. 1963.
- Fire. Doubleday. 1963.
- Beyond the Solar System. Viking Press. 1964.
- Missiles, Moonprobes, and Megaparsecs. New American Library. 1964.
- Our Work in Space. MacMillan. 1964.
- Ranger to the Moon. New American Library. 1965.
- Mariner IV to Mars. New American Library. 1966. ISBN 1-251-02668-0.
- Willy Ley's For Your Information: On Earth and in the Sky. Doubleday. 1967.
- The Borders of Mathematics. Pyramid Publications. 1967.
- Rockets, Missiles, and Men In Space (revision of Rockets, Missiles, and Space Travel). Signet Books/Viking. 1968.
- Inside the Orbit of the Earth. McGraw Hill. 1968.
- Dawn of Zoology. Prentice-Hall. 1968. ISBN 600-03-8663-X.
- The Meteorite Craters. Illustrated by John Bierhorst. Weybright and Talley. 1968.
- Discovery of the Elements. Delacourte. 1968.
- Another Look at Atlantis and Fifteen Other Essays. Doubleday. 1969. ISBN 0-517-14543-X.
- Events in Space. Popular Library. 1969.
- Visitors from Afar: The Comets. McGraw Hill. 1969. Bibcode:1969vfac.book.....L.
- Gas Giants: The Largest Planets. McGraw-Hill. 1969.
- The Drifting Continents. Weybright and Talley. 1969.
- Willy Ley's Worlds of the Past. Illustrated by Rudolph Zallinger. Golden Press. 1971.
