= KOSMICA =

Science institute

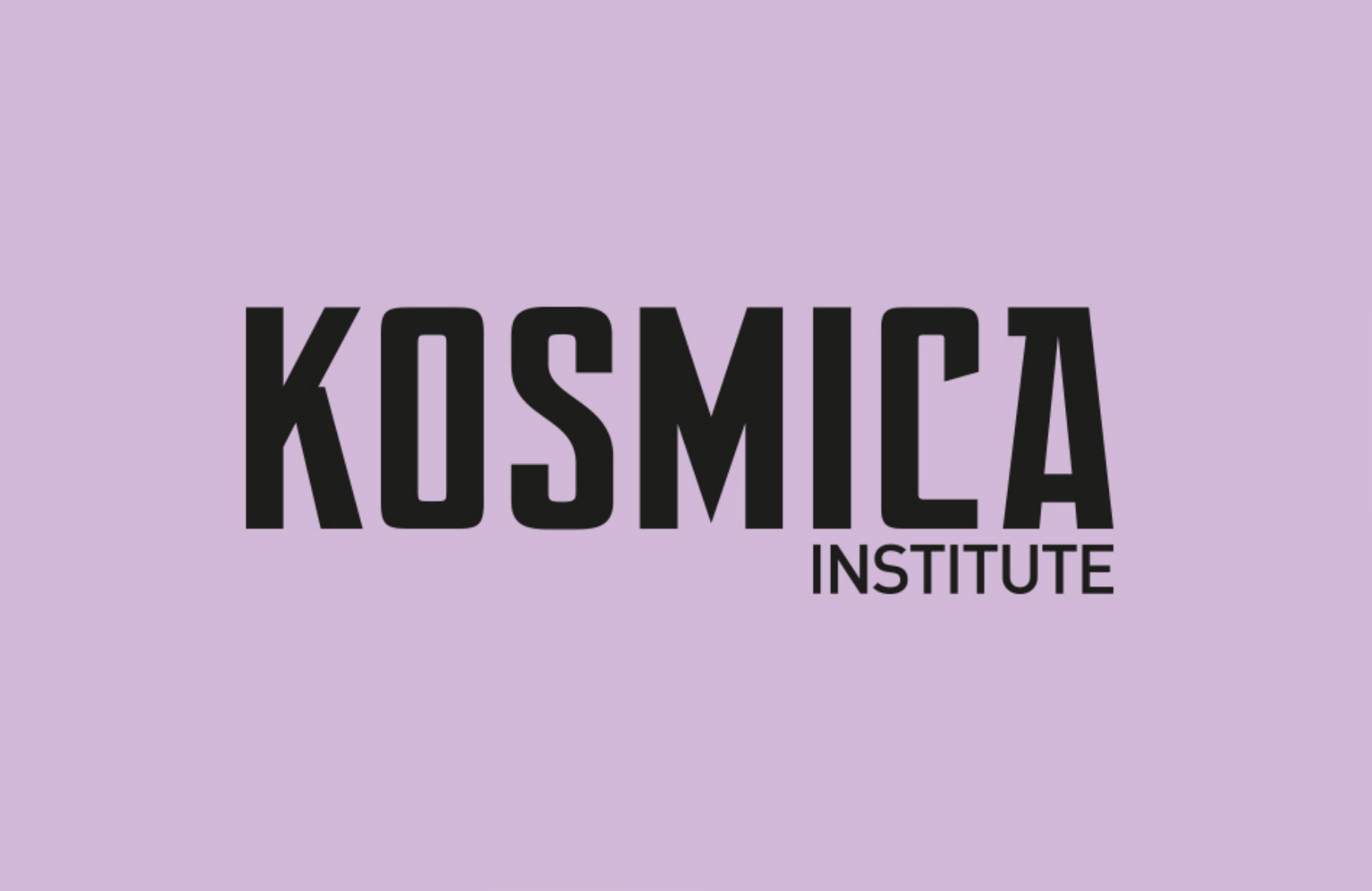
KOSMICA INSTITUTE LOGO

KOSMICA is an institute that runs poetical and critical projects about outer space activities and their impact on Earth. Its central activity is a series of curated festivals worldwide with over 20 editions in countries like UK, France, Mexico and Belgium. KOSMICA also counts with other activities such as educational programmes, publishing and other curated activities. It has local offices in Berlin (Germany) and Mexico City (Mexico), with partner organisations in London (UK) and Montreal (Canada).

== History ==
KOSMICA Institute was founded in 2011 by Berlin-based artist Nahum in partnership with The Art Catalyst in London. It started as ¨a series of galactic gatherings for earth-bound artists, space engineers, performers, astronomers, musicians and anyone interested, explore and share space in original ways. Every session is unique: bringing together the cosmically curious and culturally quirky space community.¨

Today KOSMICA organises regular festival with over 20 international editions and 180 guests from all around the globe. Its curated programmes have included topics such as feminism, queer culture, climate change, colonialism and art in outer space.

KOSMICA is endorsed by ITACCUS, the International Astronautical Federation Technical Committee for the Cultural Utilizations of Space.

“KOSMICA created an open, affable environment where the topics ranged from philosophy to the social importance of Star Trek.”

"KOSMICA opens new frontiers for artistic experimentation" - Rolling Stone Magazine

== Participants ==
KOSMICA activities have put together an international network of artists, cultural practitioners and space professionals. Among the 180 participants are Kevin Fong, Tomás Saraceno, Ariel Guzik, Aleksandra Mir, Empress Stah, Manuel Díaz, Ale de la Puente, Yuri Suzuki, Honor Harger, Roger Malina, Marko Peljhan, Nelly Ben Hayoun, Katie Paterson, Agnes Meyer-Brandis, Kapwani Kiwanga, Bompas & Parr, Frederik De Wilde, Nicola Triscott, Anais Toneur, Carey Young, Christopher Riley, Dragan Živadinov, Sarah Jane Pell, Semiconductor, Angelo Vermaulen (Seeker), Richard Clar, Patricio Guzmán, Tania Candiani and Nahum.

== Institutions and Collaborators ==
The KOSMICA Institute has collaborated with museums and institutions such as The Arts Catalyst (London), Foundation for Art and Creative Technology, FACT (Liverpool), Z33 (Hasselt), Oboro (Montreal), Laboratorio Arte Alameda (Mexico City), Centro de Cultura Digital (Mexico City), Centro Multimedia (Mexico City), Mexican Space Agency (Mexico), International Space University (Strasbourg), International Astronautical Federation, IAF (Paris), Hangar 1 (Berlin), La Colonie (Paris), amongst others.

== KOSMICA Journeys ==
In 2017 KOSMICA partnered up with local organisations and governmental bodies to start a new strand of projects aimed at those who have flown away from their homes for safety and survival reasons. KOSMICA Journeys offers a series of activities for refugees and immigrants to use the outer space perspective and reframe our understanding of Earth as the home of humanity and all its life beyond nations and states.

KOSMICA Journeys started with a collaboration with Hangar 1 in Berlin. Over a month KOSMICA delivered weekly workshops at the refugee center located at the Tempelhofer Feld in Berlin.

== Past Editions ==
- 2017, KOSMICA Paris, La Colonie, Paris, France
- 2016, KOSMICA Mexico, Cosmovitral, Laboratorio Arte Alameda, Cine Tonalá, Toluca & Mexico City, Mexico.
- 2015, KOSMICA Mexico, Laboratorio Arte Alameda, Cine Tonalá, Ovnibus, Mexico City, Mexico
- 2014, KOSMICA Mexico, Laboratorio Arte Alameda, Centro Multimedia - CENART, Centro de Cultura Digital, Mexico City, Mexico
- 2014, KOSMICA London, Bargehouse, London, UK
- 2013, KOSMICA Mexico, Laboratorio Arte Alameda, Centro Multimedia - CENART, Mexico City, Mexico
- 2013, KOSMICA London, The Arts Catalyst, London, UK
- 2013, KOSMICA Belgium, Z33, Hasselt, Belgium
- 2013, KOSMICA Paris, La Société de Curiosités, Paris, France
- 2012, KOSMICA London, The Arts Catalyst, London, UK
- 2012, KOSMICA Mexico, Laboratorio Arte Alameda, Centro Multimedia - CENART, Mexico City, Mexico
- 2012, KOSMICA Paris, La Société de Curiosités, Paris, France
- 2012, KOSMICA Liverpool, Foundation for Art and Technology (FACT), Liverpool, UK
- 2011, KOSMICA London, The Arts Catalyst, London UK
