= Nahum (artist) =

German artist

- Born: 1979 (age 45–46); Mexico City
- Occupation(s): Artist, musician, art director
- Website: http://nahum.xyz/

Nahum (born in 1979 in Mexico City, Mexico) is an artist, musician, multi-instrumentalist, performer and artistic director who lives and works in Berlin, Germany. His work combines outer space technologies, illusionism, and hypnosis to create alternative and extreme perspectives of human experience.

He is also known under the names of Nahum Mantra and Nahum Romero Zamora.

== Biography ==
Nahum "is the new generation of young professional artists creating new imaginaries that will infect the ideas of tomorrow that will make the future of space possible and is part of a movement in countries outside the major space-faring nations that is taking ownership of the space futures". Nahum is the first artist to receive the Young Space Leader Award; for his contributions to astronautics and space exploration.

Nahum is a fellow of the National System of Art Creators, National Endowment for Culture and Arts (FONCA) in Mexico and an associate artist at The Arts Catalyst, London. Nahum was the head curator of the Shunt Lounge in London. In 2015 he curated the Transitio_MX Biennial in Mexico City. He is the Founding Director of the KOSMICA Institute and chaired the Technical Activities Committee for the Cultural Use of Space (ITACCUS) at the International Astronautical Federation (IAF).

Nahum has chaired the Committee on the Cultural Use of Space (ITACCUS) at the International Astronautical Federation based in Paris, France. This committee "seeks to promote and facilitate the innovative utilisation of space (data, systems, applications) by organisations in the cultural sectors of society internationally, including all areas of the arts and humanities, including the fine arts, entertainment, popular culture and tourism."

In 2014 Nahum was the first artist to receive the Young Space Leader Award by the International Astronautical Federation for his artistic and cultural contributions to space exploration. This award recognises exceptional young professionals that have demonstrated leadership in their academic or early careers. He joined the jury in 2016

His work has been exhibited internationally in venues including: Bonniers Konsthall (Stockholm); Institute of Contemporary Arts (UK); KSEVT (Slovenia); Polytechnic Museum (Moscow); Southbank Centre (London); Rubin Center for the Visual Arts (El Paso, USA); National Taiwan Museum of Fine Arts (Taiwan); Laboratorio Arte Alameda, Mexico City (Mexico), Centro Nacional de las Artes (Mexico); Fonoteca Nacional de Mexico (Mexico).

== Studies ==
In 2016 he graduated from the International Space University (ISU), where he completed the Space Studies Program at Technion – Israel Institute of Technology in Haifa, Israel. Here he participated in the research study entitled aMARTE which was commissioned by NASA. "aMARTE reviewed the most recent discoveries on the Martian environment and evaluated the different implications thereof for human Mars exploration." Since 2015 Nahum is a visiting lecturer at ISU.

Nahum earned his Master in Arts at Goldsmiths College, University of London where he graduated with a distinction. During his studies in Goldsmiths, Nahum coursed the Music Pathway programme and joined the Goldsmiths Electronic Orchestra ensemble. He also studied a BS in Computer science at the Tecnologico de Monterrey in Mexico City.

== Work ==
"While Nahum's investigations actively engage with the cosmos, his work also suggests a more down-to-earth and self-conscious undertone to humanity's quest to conquer the unknown: understanding ourselves and where we come from." "Nahum's work is less about extraterrestrial miracles or smoke and mirrors than it is about inviting the audience to peek behind the curtain. It hinges on the validity of magical ideas and of human ability, rather than blind faith."

=== The Contour of Presence (2018) ===
On 29 June 2018, Nahum launched with SpaceX an interactive artwork to the International Space Station. ¨The work is about the interconnectedness of all things, on a cosmic scale but also here on Earth; the interpretation of the unknown as part of what we don't see but what is inevitably part of the totality of our existence.¨ ¨This project is a collaboration between the International Space University, Space Applications Services and Nahum through a partnership with the European Space Agency.

=== Matters of Gravity (2015) ===
Nahum directed the arts and science project Matters of Gravity (La Gravedad de los Asuntos in Spanish). This project reflects on gravity by its absence and it was executed in a Zero Gravity flight mission at the Yuri Gagarin Cosmonaut Training Centre.

Two years of reflection and a few seconds in zero gravity were the origins of a series of artist works that have been completed in different gravity conditions such as 2Gs and weightlessness. The resulting artworks include video, performance, sculpture, drawing, and installation.

The participating artists include: Tania Candiani, Ale de la Puente, Ivan Puig, Arcángelo Constantini, Fabiola Torres-Alzaga, Gilberto Esparza, Juan José Díaz Infante, Nahum and Marcela Armas. The project included the participation of Mexican scientist Miguel Alcubierre and curators Rob La Frenais and Kerry Anne Doyle.

The Matters of Gravity exhibition has been touring internationally at museums that include: Laboratorio Arte Alameda in Mexico City (2015), Polytechnic Museum (VDNH), Moscow (2015), Kapelica Gallery, Ljublijana, and KSEVT, Vitanje, Slovenia (2015), Rubin Center of Visual Arts, University of Texas, El Paso (2015) and the Museu de Arte de Zapopan, Jalisco, Mexico (2016).

=== Performance work and hypnosis ===
On his series of performances entitled Voyage, he applies hypnosis on the audience to create false memories about impossible journeys. ¨Nahum guides us through many visions in our own minds, as our eyes are closed. He triggers in us intense memories and visions that might be too much for some, creating the theatre in our minds to come alive.¨

In his performance Voyage: A Session for Remembering, Nahum gives to the participants a memory about walking on the Moon and experience observing the Earth from afar. During his performance Voyage: Exoplanet performed at André Breton’s house in Saint-Cirque Lapopie, France, the audience traveled to an unknown planet via hypnosis. In 2016 Nahum was invited to design a workshop and hypnosis based performance for the Insomnia exhibition at the Bonniers Konsthall in Stockholm. In 2017 he was commissioned by the Live Art Development Agency and Performance Magazine to perform Voyage: 1979. In this performance, Nahum responded to and re-contextualise the magazine for the 21st century through video and a hypnosis performance.

=== KOSMICA ===
In 2011 Nahum founded KOSMICA, an institute that encourages and promotes creative and critical discourses about the alternative, cultural and artistic uses of outer space. KOSMICA started as a series of international encounters within the spheres of art, science and outer space exploration supported by its initial partner, the Arts Catalyst in London. "Each KOSMICA session is unique: bringing together the cosmically curious and culturally quirky space community for a social mix of art–space programmes – a film screening, performance or live concert with a short presentation, talk and debate about alternative and cultural uses of space."

KOSMICA has organised over 20 events and festivals and has featured over 150 space artists, cultural practitioners and space professionals in the UK, France, Belgium, Mexico, Germany and Canada. Some KOSMICA curations include topics such as Women in Space, Astroculture, War and Peace, amongst others.

Some KOSMICA participants have included Kevin Fong, Tomás Saraceno, Ariel Guzik, Aleksandra Mir, Empress Stah, Yuri Suzuki, Honor Harger, Roger Malina, Marko Peljhan, Nelly Ben Hayoun, Katie Paterson, Agnes Meyer-Brandis, Kapwani Kiwanga, Bompas & Parr, Frederik De Wilde, Nicola Triscott, Anais Toneur, Carey Young, Christopher Riley, Dragan Živadinov, Sarah Jane Pell and Tania Candiani. "KOSMICA created an open, affable environment where the topics ranged from philosophy to the social importance of Star Trek."

== Music ==
Nahum is a composer and multi-instrumentalist. He is widely known to play the Theremin, an electronic musical instrument controlled without physical contact. Nahum has performed with Peter Theremin, the great-grandson of Leon Theremin. He earned an MA Music Pathway from Goldsmiths College, University of London where he joined the Goldsmiths Electronic Orchestra.

=== Orchestra Elastique ===
Nahum is a founding member of Orchestra Elastique, an international music improvisation collective. Formed during a residency at the Shunt Vaults in April 2010, Orchestra Elastique comprises a group of performers and multi-instrumentalists. The core members of Orchestra Elastique are Joris Beets, Antoine Gilleron, Bruno Humberto, Nahum, Philippe Lenzini and Tristan Shorr. Regular collaborators include Steph Patten (cello), Fiona Bevan (vocals, violin) and Larry Achiampong (bass, vocals) among others.

¨Orchestra Elastique is dedicated to testing the possibilities of improvised music and live scoring with a touch of psychedelia, avant classical, drone, ambient, electro-acoustic, minimalistic, krautrock amongst other yet unknown genres. The ongoing motif of the collective is to face music as a playground, as a sensorial and enduring physical engaged performance to explore mental spaces of communion through sound. In this live exploration we take from a broad palette of instruments, styles and traditions of music and sound making. Each concert is an occasion to embark on a fresh exploration of music; a one-off experience shared between performers and audience members. The music that we create evolves in unexpected formations by multiplying and testing the possibilities that reside in live acts and making visceral sonic landscapes that in old times would have been forbidden and punished by the inquisition.¨

¨Orchestra Elastique regularly play at Café Oto, The Vortex and the Servant Jazz Quarters in London, and in April 2014 they represented the UK with jazz legend Dave Holland at the International Arts Festival FIA in San Jose, Costa Rica.¨ Their discography includes the soundtrack for a "Fallible Girl" and original albums "My Father Was A Fakir" and "London Live Sessions 1".

== Exhibitions ==
=== Solo exhibitions ===
- 2016, Matters of Gravity, Museo de Arte de Zapopan, Zapopan, Jalisco, Mexico
- 2016, Evocations of a Forgotten Voyage, Nora Sotres Gallery, Mexico City, Mexico
- 2016, Evocations of a Forgotten Voyage, Visual Voice Gallery, Montreal, Canada
- 2015, Matters of Gravity, Rubin Center, University of Texas, El Paso, Texas, US
- 2015, Matters of Gravity, KSEVT, Vitanje, Slovenia
- 2015, Matters of Gravity, Kapelica Gallery, Ljubljana, Slovenia
- 2015, Matters of Gravity, Polytechnic Museum – VDNH, Moscow, Russia
- 2015, Matters of Gravity, Laboratorio Arte Alameda, Mexico City, Mexico
- 2012, Big Bang Calling, Laboratorio Arte Alameda, Mexico City, Mexico

=== Group exhibitions ===
- 2017, ISEA, Inter-Society for the Electronic Arts, Manizales Fairs and Exhibitions Center (Expoferias), Manizales, Colombia
- 2017, No Such Thing As Gravity, NTMoFA, Taiwan National Museum of Fine Arts, Taichung, Taiwan
- 2016 Drifting away from Earth: A dream laboratory, Bonniers Konsthall, Stockholm, Sweden
- 2015 Polytech.Science.Art, Garage Museum, Moscow, Russia
- 2014 Murmurs on the Skies, Artes y Medios – Galeria AB, Mexico City, Mexico
- 2013 The Clipperton Project, Museo Diego Rivera Anahuaccalli, Mexico City, Mexico
- 2009 The Future of Sound, Arnolfini, Bristol, UK

=== Performances ===
- 2017, Voyage: A Session for Remembering, ART25, Berlin
- 2017, Voyage: A Session for Remembering, Kampnagel – Performance Studies international Conference #23, Hamburg, Germany
- 2017, Voyage: 1979, British Library, Performance Magazine Launch, London UK
- 2017, Magic for Dissidence, NTMoFA, Taiwan National Museum of Fine Arts, Taichung, Taiwan
- 2016, Voyage: A session for Remembering, part of No Such Thing As Gravity, FACT (Foundation for Art and Creative Technology), Liverpool, UK
- 2016, Voyage: A session for Remembering, McGill Observatory, Montreal, Canada
- 2015, Murmurs on the Sky, El Ingenio, San Cristobal de las Casas, Chiapas, Mexico
- 2015, Evocations of a Forgotten Voyage, Aether – University of the Arts London, Londond, UK
- 2015, Can Science be a Story of believing in Magic?, Garage Museum, Moscow, Russia
- 2015, Evocations of a Forgotten Voyage, Museo de Arte de Zapopan, Zapopan, Jalisco, Mexico
- 2013, Murmurs on the Sky, GV Art London, London UK
- 2013, Can Science be a Story of believing in Magic?, Obro, Montreal, Canada
- 2013, Science and RE-Enchantment, Obro, Montreal, Canada
- 2013, A Case for Levania, KOSMICA, Laboratorio Arte Alameda, Mexico City, Mexico
- 2012, The Magical Ideas Behind Space Exploration, Cosmonauts Late – Science Museum London, London, UK
- 2009, Let's Murder the Moonshine: 100 Years of Futurism, George Wood Theatre, London, UK

== See also ==
- Herman Potočnik Noordung Center of Space Technologies
