= Arts Catalyst =

Contemporary arts organisation

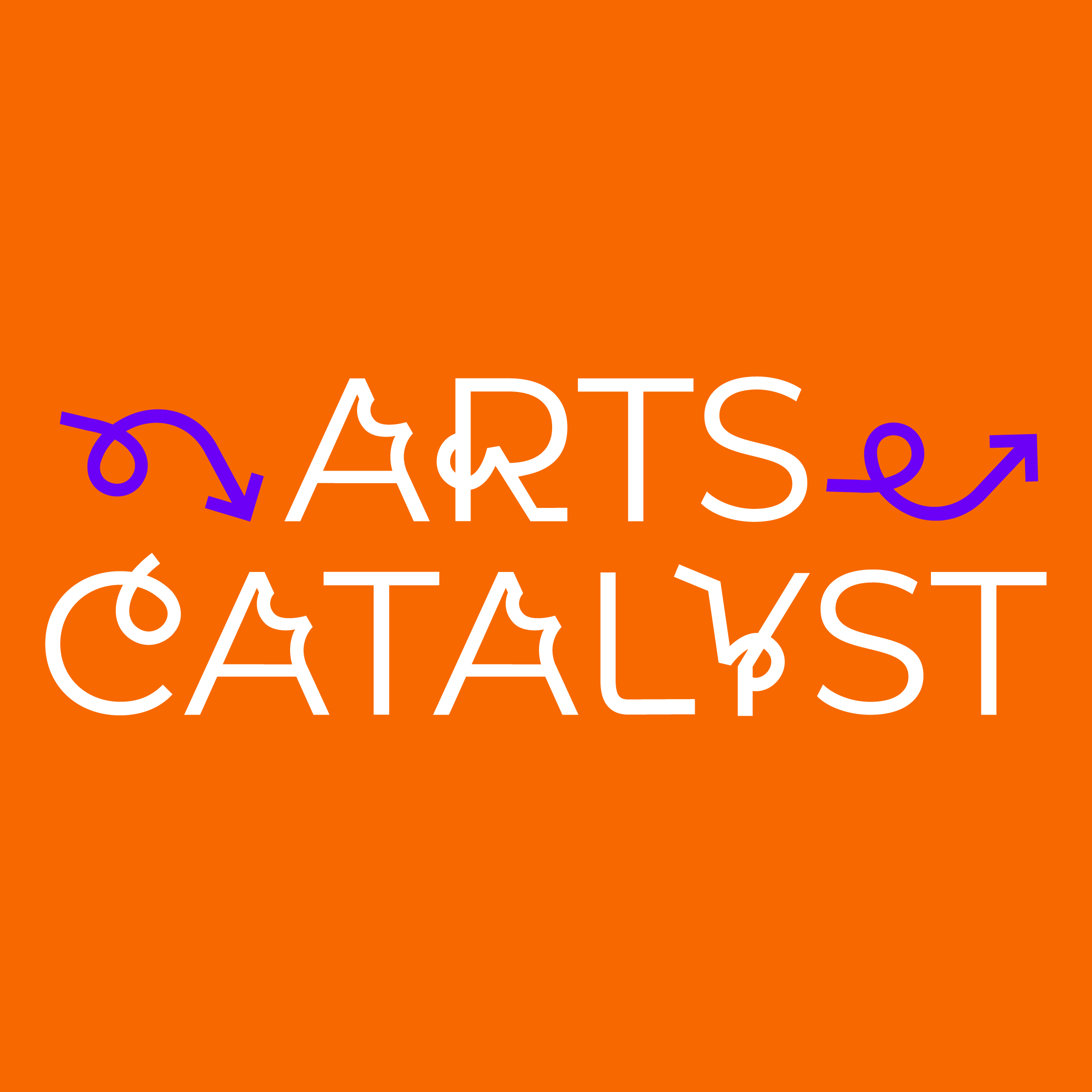
Arts Catalyst Logo 2022 orange

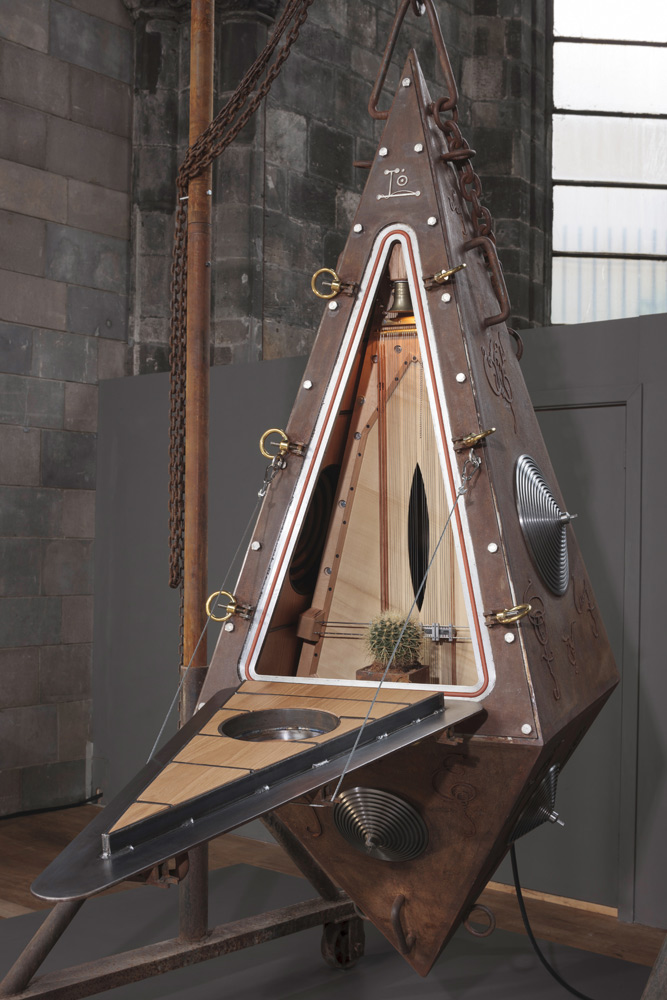
"Holoturian" is an underwater resonance instrument designed by Ariel to communicate with whales and dolphins in the deep seas. This work was commissioned and produced by Arts Catalyst with the Edinburgh Art Festival 2015.

Arts Catalyst is a visual arts organisation and charity based in Sheffield, UK. They commission artists and use art to explore social and environmental issues, provoke debate, and test out alternative ways of learning, frequently working in non-traditional arts spaces, often within a particular landscape.

Since 1994, the organisation has commissioned more than 170 artists’ projects, including major new works by the Otolith Group, Agnes Meyer Brandis, Tomás Saraceno, Aleksandra Mir, Larry Achiampong and David Blandy, and Susan Schuppli.

Arts Catalyst is registered in England by the Charity Commission, No. 1042433. Arts Catalyst is an Arts Council England National Portfolio Organisation.

== History ==
Arts Catalyst was founded in 1994 by Nicola Triscott.

Since 1994, Arts Catalyst has commissioned various artists in a range of art forms such as live art, artists' film and video, installation, media art, performance, and bioart, such as Kira O'Reilly, Critical Art Ensemble and The Otolith Group, presented as exhibitions and events.

Arts Catalyst is involved in education, research and artists' professional development. It has also organised symposia, schools projects, participatory projects, workshops, microgravity flight experiments, family days and conferences.

== Artists ==
Arts Catalyst has commissioned more than 120 contemporary artist's projects that engage with science. Notable artists the organisation has commissioned include Tomas Saraceno, The Otolith Group (Kodwo Eshun, Anjalika Sagar), Critical Art Ensemble, James Acord, Laurie Anderson, Nahum, Marcel.li Antunez Roca, Lise Autogena, Brandon Ballengée, Anne Bean, Steve Beard, Andy Bichlbaum (Jacques Servin), Ansuman Biswas, Brian Catling, Oron Catts, Helen Chadwick, Gina Czarnecki, Beatriz da Costa, Adam Dant, Jan Fabre, Simon Faithfull, Jem Finer, Alec Finlay, Vadim Fishkin, Stefan Gec, Jack Klaff, Tim Knowles, Andrew Kotting, Steve Kurtz, Yuri Leiderman, Aleksandra Mir, Kira O'Reilly, Marko Peljhan, Esther Polak, Snæbjörnsdóttir | Wilson, Ashok Sukumaran, Neal White (Office of Experiments), Aaron Williamson, Carey Young, Ariel Guzik.

== Projects ==
In the 1990s, its commissions included Helen Chadwick's sensitive creations involving human embryos, James Acord's radioactive sculptures, Kitsou Dubois's choreography in zero gravity. An early project was Ansuman Biswas' 'CAT' in 1997, which used the quantum physics 'thought experiment' Schrödinger's Cat as a provocation to explore the nature of uncertainty and unknowing on a human level. The artist contained himself in a windowless room-sized box for ten days in a durational performance that played on the notion of the Schrödinger's Cat experiment. The experiment was followed by three presentations considering non-western culture, sound and shamanic practices and Western science and Chinese medical practices.

Arts Catalyst has commissioned and collaborated with the US arts collective Critical Art Ensemble on a number of projects that involve biotechnology and plan further work with them in 2014. Triscott writes in her chapter in the book Interfaces Of Performance of the motivations for this work: "There has been a disconnect between science's progress and society's involvement and understanding, and that people may not understand the implications of biotechnology and its commercial applications."

Arts Catalyst has also produced projects looking at culture, technology and climate change in the Polar regions, including Simon Faithfull's "Ice Blink" in 2006, an interdisciplinary symposium 'Polar: Fieldwork and Archive Fever' in conjunction with the British Library and The Open University in 2007, and a related publication, Bipolar, edited by Kathryn Yusoff and published by Arts Catalyst in 2008 to mark the International Polar Year 2007–8. Arts Catalyst is also part of the Arctic Perspective Initiative, a project founded by artists Marko Peljhan and Matthew Biederman. Arctic Perspective Cahier No. 2: Arctic Geopolitics and Autonomy edited by Nicola Triscott and Michael Bravo reflects on "the necessity to discard simplistic perspectives on the Arctic region".

The organisation was involved with the theme of space exploration. Since 1999, they have presented many projects that explore sub-orbital space, outer space, the International Space Station (ISS), and more recently, the moon. Their work in zero gravity includes projects with Kitsou Dubois and the MIR (Microgravity Interdisciplinary Research) consortium (2000 to 2004). They were recently commissioned by the European Space Agency to develop a cultural policy for the orbiting International Space Station. In 2006, Arts Catalyst presented Space Soon: Art and Human Spaceflight, a five-day event at the Roundhouse (venue), London, that included new work by Aleksandra Mir, N55 (art collective)/Neal White, and London Fieldworks, with talks by astronaut turned artist Alan Bean, the fourth man to walk on the moon, NASA artist-in-residence Laurie Anderson and many others. In 2008, Arts Catalyst presented "Less Remote: The Futures of Space Exploration - An Arts and Humanities Symposium" at the 59th International Astronautical Congress in Glasgow, Scotland. In 2011, Arts Catalyst organised the exhibition Republic of the Moon with FACT Liverpool, about reimagining the future of the Moon.

In 2009, Arts Catalyst curated the exhibition and event 'Interspecies' at Cornerhouse, Manchester, and the A Foundation, London. This presented new commissioned works by Kira O'Reilly, Nicolas Primat, Antony Hall, Ruth Maclennan, and works by Rachel Mayeri, Snaebjornsdottir and Wilson, and Beatriz da Costa. Supported by an events performances, talks and workshops, the project explored the notion of artists working with animals as equals, the relationship that humans have with other species, and current discourse in animal studies and primatology. A special issue of Antennae: The Journal of Nature in Visual Culture, published in summer 2010, was devoted to the Interspecies project, and explored the artists' projects and concepts further.

In 2010, Arts Catalyst commissioned a series of works for The Great Glen Artists Airshow an area encompassing Loch Ness and the Caledonian Canal. The artists and organisations involved in this event were PolakVanBekkum, London Fieldworks, Alec Finlay, Adam Dant, Camila Sposati and Susanne Norregard Nielsen. The event consisted of performances, ephemeral landscape installations, poetry readings and kite-flying workshops, all of which were intended to redefine philosophical territory of the air exploring ideas about ownership rights, cartography and aerial movement.

Arts Catalyst's commission of Rachel Mayeri's Primate Cinema: Apes as Family continues their interest in interspecies communication. The 21-minute film is thought to be the first made by an artist for an audience of chimpanzees The film won the honour at Prix Arts Electronica 2011 and was scheduled for screening at Sundance Film Festival in 2014.

In 2011, Arts Catalyst curated a touring exhibition entitled Republic of the Moon with FACT Liverpool Foundation for Art and Creative Technology. Republic of The Moon was a response to private corporations interested in exploiting the Moon's natural resources. Artists were inspired by utilitarian plans of lunar mines and military bases, the lives of astronauts such as Yuri Gagarin and early sci-fi literature such as The Man in the Moone by Francis Godwin.

Agnes Meyer-Brandis's commission for the exhibition, "Moon Goose Analogue", involved her raising eleven geese from birth, imprinting herself as goose-mother and training them to be astronauts. The artist created a moon analogue colony for the geese in Pollinaria, Italy, which could be interacted with live from a control room installed in the gallery and then toured to Great North Museum, Newcastle upon Tyne, for the AV Festival 2012 and Art Museum Z33 in 2013.

Sue Corke and Hagen Betzweiser created the installation "Enter At Own Risk" in which a lone astronaut gardens a group of rocks, spraying them with their synthesised smell of the Moon, a recipe based on reports from the Apollo crew.

In 2013, Arts Catalyst joined forces with HeHe to create an indoor fracking installation, "Fracking Futures", at FACT Liverpool. Their mischievous miniature installation was designed to provoke debate about the economical and ecological implications of hydraulic fracturing.

Arts Catalyst has also curated a touring exhibition presenting some of the most innovative and progressive examples of contemporary architecture in Antarctica drawing together projects that both utilise cutting-edge technology and engineering, but have also considered aesthetics, sustainability and human needs in their ground-breaking designs for research stations. Initiated by the British Council, Ice Lab: New Architecture and Science in Antarctica which was first shown at The Lighthouse in Glasgow with Art + Design Scotland and then toured to MOSI (Museum of Science & Industry, Manchester) and will continue on tour in 2014 in New Zealand.

In 2014, Arts Catalyst returned to the subject of the moon with Republic of the Moon at Bargehouse, South Bank, London, with a new line-up of artists including Katie Paterson, Leonid Tishkov, Moon Vehicle, Agnes Meyer-Brandis and Liliane Lijn. will be artists in residence and they will run a series of events alongside the show including KOSMICA Full Moon Party and Global Lunar Day.

In 2015, Arts Catalyst, with Edinburgh Art Festival, commissioned and produced "Holoturian", an underwater resonance instrument designed by Mexican artist Ariel Guzik to communicate with whales and dolphins in the deep seas.

In 2016, the organisation launched a new place in King's Cross, London, called Arts Catalyst Centre for Art, Science and Technology. The Centre combined the two cultures, offering a permanent spot to publicly showcase projects from home and abroad, as well as foment new plans.

In 2019, Nicola Triscott stepped down as Artistic Director and took up a position as Chief Executive at Liverpool's FACT. Sheffield based Laura Clarke was appointed as the new Artistic Director.

In 2020, Arts Catalyst relocated to Sheffield, building upon their work in the 2019 programme, Recentring Attention. This was a programme of workshops and walks conceived as a collective public research process in Sheffield that explored the ways in which extraction, industry and geology have shaped the relationships between humans and non-humans in the region.

In 2021, Arts Catalyst launched Radio Arts Catalyst, an online platform that explores radio as a site of encounter; and as a critical space in which to collectively address current social, political and environmental challenges happening on a hyperlocal and a planetary scale. Radio Arts Catalyst is made up of an evolving programme of artist projects, audio experiments and sonic inquiries connected to Arts Catalyst’s ongoing programme.

Between 2021 and 2023, Arts Catalyst produced the Emergent Ecologies programme, a series of artist projects across South Yorkshire that explore how our experiences of place — from wetlands and waterways to city centre streets — and of ourselves within them, are shaped with and by other beings. Artists commissioned as part of this programme include Rachel Pimm, Bahbak Hashemi-Nezhad, a place of their own, Luiza Prado de O. Martins and Harun Morrison.

In 2022, Arts Catalyst opened a space in Sheffield city centre, Soft Ground, intended as a communal space for creativity and shared with other local arts organisations and creative charities.
