= Vranken (surname) =

Vranken is a Dutch surname, and notable people with the surname are as follows:

- Desiree Vranken (born 1997), Dutch wheelchair racer
- Howard Van Vranken, American diplomat
- Jan Vranken (1948–2025), Dutch academic
- Leon Vranken (born 1975), Belgian artist
- Nicholas Van Vranken Franchot (1855–1943), American businessman and politician
