= Agnes Meyer =

Agnes Meyer may refer to:

- Agnes Meyer-Brandis (born 1973), German artist
- Agnes Meyer Driscoll (1889–1971), American cryptanalyst
- Agnes E. Meyer (1887–1970), American journalist, wife of financier Eugene Meyer, mother of publisher Katharine Graham
