= AV Festival =

AV Festival was an international festival of contemporary art, film, and music, based in Newcastle upon Tyne; however, the festival often took place across the North East of England. A biennial event, the festival was thematically curated in relation to contemporary artistic practice. The festival ran from 2003 to 2018.

== Festival Editions ==
=== AV Festival 2018: Meanwhile, What About Socialism? (Part Two) ===
AV Festival 2018 ran from 3-31 March.

=== AV Festival 2016: Meanwhile, What About Socialism? (Part One) ===
AV Festival 2016 ran from 28 Feb - 31 March.

Artists: Masao Adachi (Japan) | Amber (UK) | Lindsay Anderson (UK) | Bianca Baldi (South Africa) | Eric Baudelaire (France) | Berwick Street Collective (UK) | Tim Brennan (UK) | Kevin Brownlow and Andrew Mollo (UK) | Kris Canavan (UK) | Hugo Canoilas (Portugal) | Cinema Action (UK) | Oleksandr Dovzhenko (USSR) | Arthur Elton and Edgar Anstey (UK) | Claire Fontaine (France) | Luke Fowler (UK) | Ranu Ghosh (India) | Peter Gidal (UK) | Ruby Grierson (UK) | Humphrey Jennings (UK) | Marc Karlin (UK) | Mikhail Kaufman (USSR) | Sergei Loznitsa (Belarus) | Madhusudhanan (India) | Oleg Mavromatti (Russia) | Ken McMullen and Stuart Brisley (UK) | Naeem Mohaiemen (Bangladesh) | Pallavi Paul (India) | Dan Perjovschi (Romania) | Karel Reisz (UK) | R.E.P. (Revolutionary Experimental Space) (Ukraine) | Mykola Ridnyi (Ukraine) | Roee Rosen (Israel) | Paul Rotha (UK) | Felix Sobolev (USSR) | Haim Sokol (Russia) | Thomas Spence (UK) | Test Dept (UK) | Robert Vas (Hungary) | Dziga Vertov (USSR)

=== AV Festival 2014: Extraction ===
AV Festival 2014: Extraction ran from 1–31 March 2014. The curated programme featured 11 exhibitions, 36 film screenings, 10 concerts and 11 new commissions.

The festival included newly commissioned art works, sound walk and performances by Akio Suzuki, as well as new commissions by Susan Stenger and Lara Almarcegui, with weekend focuses on Digging for Sound and Post-Colonial Cinema. In the closing, the Test Dept returned with their debut event since the group disbanded in 1997. This event took place at Dunston Staiths. Viewed from boats on the River Tyne over three nights, the event marked the 30th anniversary of the Miners' Strike.

=== AV Festival 2012: As Slow As Possible ===
AV Festival 2012: As Slow As Possible ran from 1–31 March 2012, and had the curatorial theme of slowness. Titled after ASLSP (As SLow aS Possible), by artist John Cage, the AV Festival 2012 theme explored how artists have stretched and marked the passage of time. Some works lasted the full 31 days of the Festival. The festival ran for a whole month. It took place across Newcastle, Gateshead, Middlesbrough and Sunderland, including 22 exhibitions, 38 film screenings, 15 concerts, six walks, a 744-hour continuous online radio, plus 16 new commissions and 18 UK premieres. The AV Festival 2012 included: new commissions by Yoshi Wada, Susan Stenger, Phill Niblock, Jonathan Schipper and Torsten Lauschmann; the closing Festival Slowalk by Hamish Fulton; a tribute concert to John Cage; Kenneth Goldsmith in Morden Tower; and public readings of On Kawara's One Million Years.

The festival's film programme included special screenings with James Benning, Ben Rivers and Lav Diaz; concerts included a special tribute to Peter Christopherson; the festival ran a 744-hour special online radio.

AV Festival 2012 achieved 94,096 visits, a 33% increase from 2010. It attracted 24% of visitors from outside the region, contributed £516k GVA to the local economy, and achieved a return on investment of £2.88 for every £1 of public funding received. In his Guardian article, Sukhdev Sandhu described the Festival as "one of the most imaginative festivals to be staged in the UK for many years."

=== AV Festival 2010: Energy ===
AV Festival 2010: Energy ran from 5–14 March 2010, and had the curatorial theme of energy. It approached the theme from a scientific and spiritual perspective. New commissions included a coal-fired computer, a café importing via social networks, a film tracking the movement of the sun, and compositions based on the 'energy' of rivers.

Highlights of AV Festival 2010 included: new commissions by Charlemagne Palestine, Graham Harwood, Kaffe Matthews, Lee Patterson and Jana Winderen; Kate Rich's Feral Trade Café with its daily menu; exhibitions by Felix Gonzalez-Torres, Felix Hess, artificiel and Zilvinas Kempinas; and the closing night performance with Iain Sinclair, Alan Moore, Susan Stenger, FM Einheit and Stephen O'Malley. In addition, the festival included a focus on recycled film with Kenneth Anger, Craig Baldwin and Rick Prelinger, an underwater concert by Cluster, Liliane Lijn's Power Game and a guest lecture by Gustav Metzger.

The festival included 24 exhibitions, 20 performances, 15 screenings, 14 talks, 3 symposia, 2 residencies and a café. This included working with 140 artists, on 18 new commissions and 15 UK premieres, in partnership with 31 venues. Over ten days, there were 70,860 visits, an increase of 65% from 2008. The festival contributed £480k of GVA to the local economy, and achieved £1.25 of economic output per pound invested. AV Festival 2010 won a Silver Award at the North East Tourism Awards.

=== AV Festival 2008: Broadcast ===
AV Festival 2008: Broadcast ran from 28 February – 8 March 2008, and had the curatorial theme of broadcast. The UK began to switch off analog television signals in 2007. AV Festival 2008 celebrated the history of transmission. It was directed by Honor Harger.

The AV Festival 2008 included new commissions by Chris Watson and Marko Peljhan, the live performance of John Cage's Variations VII, and solo exhibitions by Harun Farocki, Sonia Boyce, Staalplaat Soundsystem and Joyce Hinterding. In addition, the festival ran three FM radio stations across the region, a special tribute to the radiophonic workshop, performances by Jean-Jacques Perrey, a series of TV screenings at the cinema, and a symposia about music, sound and broadcasting technologies.

AV Festival 2008 took place across Newcastle, Gateshead, Sunderland and Middlesbrough, and included 12 exhibitions, 37 screenings, 18 performances, 18 talks, symposia and workshops, 14 new commissions, 4 launch events and 3 radio stations. Over ten-days, there were a total of 43,038 visits, a 26% increase from 2006. 42% of the festival's audience had not been to a similar event before. AV Festival 2008 won a Silver Award at the North East Tourism Awards.

=== AV Festival 2006: LifeLike ===
AV Festival 2006: LifeLike ran from 2–12 March 2006, and had the curatorial theme of life sciences. AV Festival 2006 featured works that show how technology can impersonate life. It also explored biotechnology, genetic engineering and cloning. It was directed by Honor Harger.

The AV Festival 2006 included new commissions by Ryoji Ikeda, Michael Nyman, Gina Czarnecki, Anthony McCall and Kenneth Rinaldo; a live performance by Alva Noto (Carsten Nicolai); Suguro Goto's robotic orchestra; and the premiere of Critical Art Ensemble's Marching Plague. In addition, there was a comprehensive film programme about how cinema has played a role in our visions of the future and a two-day symposium.

AV Festival 2006 took place across Newcastle, Gateshead, Sunderland and Middlesbrough, and included 13 exhibitions, 29 screenings, 8 performances, 17 talks, symposia and workshops, 9 new commissions, and 4 launch events. Over ten days, it achieved 34,142 visits, of which 88% were new audiences to the Festival. AV Festival 2006 featured the festival's first exhibition programme with special preview evenings, including a new installation by Anthony McCall.

=== AV Festival 2003: Pilot Edition ===
AV Festival 2003 took place primarily in cinema spaces across the region, including the recently closed and abandoned Odeon (Paramount) Cinema on Pilgrim Street in Newcastle. Highlights included: the live performance of Man with a Movie Camera by The Cinematic Orchestra; Time Code Live with Mike Figgis; and Matthew Barney's The Cremaster Cycle. In addition there was a Mike Figgis mini-retrospective, a series of onedotzero programmes, artist films at Cineside including Lillian Schwartz, newly commissioned Richard Fenwick films, and a live performance by Tina Frank.
