= Radioqualia =

r a d i o q u a l i a is an art collaboration by New Zealanders, Adam Hyde and Honor Harger, founded in 1998 in Australia. Since 1999 they have been based in several different countries including the Netherlands, the UK and Latvia.

r a d i o q u a l i a create broadcasts, installations, performances and online artworks. Their principal interest is how broadcasting technologies can be used to create new artistic forms, and how sound art can be used to illuminate abstract ideas.

Key works include: The Frequency Clock (1998 - 2003), Free Radio Linux (2002 – 2004), Radio Astronomy (2004 -> now)

They have exhibited at museums, galleries and festivals, including: NTT ICC, Tokyo; New Museum, New York; Gallery 9, Walker Art Center, USA; Sónar, Barcelona; Ars Electronica festivals, Linz, Austria; Experimental Art Foundation, Australia; Maison Europeenne de la Photographie, Paris; and the Physics Room, New Zealand.

In August 2004 they were joint winners of a UNESCO Digital Art Prize (second place) for Radio Astronomy.

== Related pages ==
- New media art
- Electronic art
