= Estela de Luz =

Monument in Mexico City, Mexico

- ("Stele of Light")
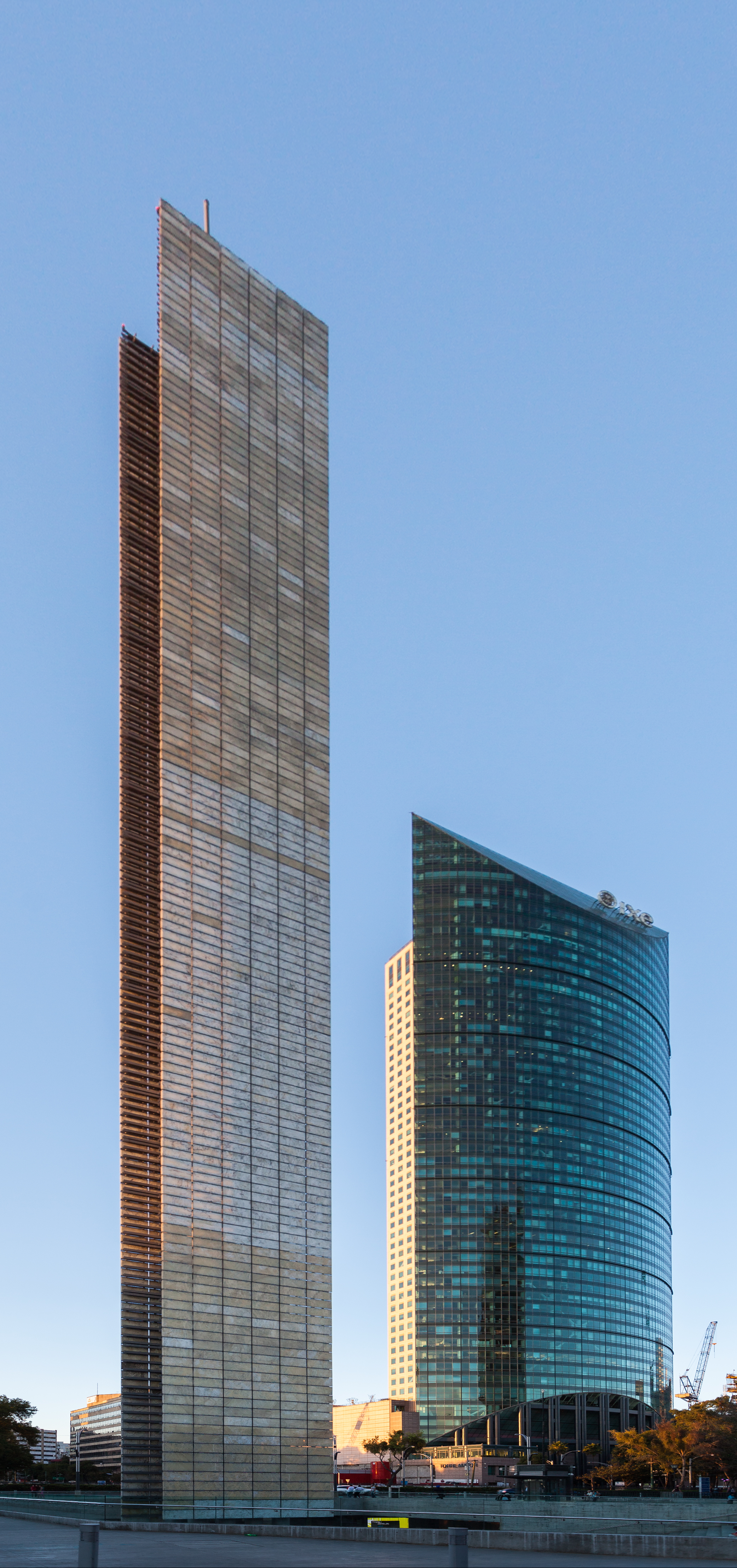
- "Estela de Luz" monument and the Torre Mayor in the background
- Interactive map of Estela de Luz
- Location: Avenida Paseo de la Reforma at easternmost end of Chapultepec Park (Calle Lieja)
- Coordinates: 19°25′23″N 99°10′33″W
- Material: quartz
- Height: 104 m (341 ft)
- Beginning date: September 22, 2009
- Completion date: December 31, 2011
- Opening date: January 7, 2012
- Dedicated to: Bicentennial of Independence/Centennial of the Revolution

The Estela de Luz (Stele of Light) is a monument in Mexico City built in 2011 to commemorate the bicentenary of Mexico's independence from Spanish rule. Its design was the winning entry in an invited competition to seek the best combination of Mexico's past and future; the design uses quartz and electric lighting to achieve this effect. The Estela de Luz is mainly used for cultural events. Below it, the Centro de Cultura Digital cultural complex was built.

The monument is popularly known as the Suavicrema (a brand of ice cream wafer) due to the resemblance on its shape to said wafer.

== Criticism ==
The Estela de Luz was criticized for being built late for the main ceremonies and for exceeding the estimated costs by almost three times. Officials noted that the structure needed to be reinforced against earthquakes, similarly to that of the Torre Mayor. This reinforcement, coupled with conflicts between the architect and the construction company, were major reasons for the additional time and expense. Two months after the January 2012 inauguration, the Estela de Luz was tested by the 2012 Guerrero–Oaxaca earthquake, which it withstood, along with other tall buildings in the area.
