= Kira O'Reilly =

British artist

Kira O'Reilly is a performance artist based in the UK. She graduated from Cardiff School of Art in 1998, and has participated in a number of performance art festivals throughout the UK and Europe, including at the Bonington Gallery, Nottingham Trent University 1998, the National Review of Live Art, in Glasgow (1998, 2001, 2003), at Arnolfini in Bristol, at Home in London and at several European festivals including Break 21 Festival, Ljubljana, Slovenia, 2002 and ANTI - Contemporary Art Festival 2003, Kuopio, Finland. She performed in China at the Dadao performance art festival, Beijing, organised by Shu Yang 2006.

Between 2003 and 2004, O'Reilly undertook a residency with SymbioticA, a bio-art project based in the department of Human Anatomy, University of Western Australia. She has received several major commissions and in 2001 was invited to produce work for Span2 international performance art residency in London. Her work often involves the cutting of her skin, and recent pieces have also involved animals, including leeches and pigs. She was the focus of a major controversy in the British press, angering British animal rights activists by performing a durational piece with a dead pig, at the Newlyn Art Gallery in Penzance, southwest England. As a response, O'Reilly then undertook a durational performance, "Falling Asleep With a Pig" (2009), in which the artist lived with a live pig called Delia for some days in a specially constructed sty. The work was commissioned for the show 'Interspecies' by The Arts Catalyst, and was shown at Cornerhouse Manchester and the A Foundation, London.

Between 2016–18 Kira O’Reilly was a Lecturer, Ecology and Contemporary Performance at Theatre Academy of the University of the Arts Helsinki, where she led a new MA pilot in Ecology and Contemporary Performance.

In 2017 the Live Art Development Agency published the first major survey publication of O'Reilly titled Kira O'Reilly Untitled (Bodies). The publication includes interviews, archive material and O'Reilly's own writings.

In 2020 O'Reilly became International Randall Chair in sculpture at Alfred University, New York.

== Selected works ==
- inthewrongplaceness (2005–2009)
- Falling Asleep with a Pig (2009)
- Unitled (for you beloved) (2008)
- Untitled (Syncope) (2007)
- Stair Falling (2009) In this performance O'Reilly stages a 'fall' down a flight of stairs in the nude.
