= Sarah Jane Pell =

- Born: Melbourne, Australia
- Education: Victorian College of the Arts, University of Melbourne, Victoria University of Technology, Edith Cowan University, International Space University, Singularity University, Embry-Riddle Aeronautical University
- Occupations: Artist, explorer, researcher, commercial diver, filmmaker, simulation astronaut
- Known for: Pioneering "aquabatics" performed underwater. First artist, and Australian Woman Astronaut Candidate
- Height: 186 cm (6 ft 1 in)
- Relatives: Niece to George Cardinal Pell
- Awards: Australia Council Fellow 2016, TED Fellow 2010, Freedman Foundation Travelling Art Scholar 2004
- Website: sarahjanepell.com artistastronaut.com

Sarah Jane Pell (born 30 December 1974) is an Australian artist, researcher and occupational diver. Her works combine the traditions of Performance art and human factors with Underwater habitat and Occupational diving technologies. She is best known for pioneering "aquabatics" that is performed underwater or shown in museums as films and artefacts. She designs civilian space-analogues and produces speculative fiction, live art, and novel experiments.

== Early life and education ==
Born in Melbourne, Australia, Sarah was naturally athletic, artistic and scholastically inclined as she grew up. She holds a Bachelor of Fine Arts degree from Victorian College of the Arts, Australia (1995) and a Masters of Arts in Human Performance from Victoria University of Technology, Australia (1998). Pell was conferred a Doctor of Philosophy, Visual Art, from Edith Cowan University, Australia (2006). She is an alumna of the International Space University, France (2006), Singularity University, NASA Ames Research Park, California (2010) and Embry-Riddle Aeronautical University, Daytona Beach, Florida (2016).

== Career ==
=== Early professional career ===
Pell has been a visual and performing arts professional for over 20 years. Her first major art production captioned "The Many-to-Many World" premiered in the Great Hall of the National Gallery of Victoria (1997) and it incorporated climbing in the trans-disciplinary Choreography. Sarah supported her art by working for well-respected curators, galleries, festivals and museums before moving to Western Australia in 2001. She was the inaugural Doctor of Philosophy candidate at the Western Australian Academy of Performing Arts (WAAPA) supported by an ECU Pro Vice-Chancellor's Research Advancement & Enterprise Scholarship (2002–2005).

=== Exhibitions ===
Pell's artworks have been shown in various Arts galleries, museums and other venues across Australia, Asia, Scandinavia, UK, and Europe. Among them include:

- Substance & Transparency, National Gallery of Victoria, Melbourne (1998)
- Spectrum Project Space, Perth (2002)
- Walking with Water, Western Australian Maritime Museum (2005), Perth Institute of Contemporary Arts (2006)
- Taiwan-Australian New Media Art Festival Kuandu Museum of Fine Arts, Taipei National University of the Arts Taiwan (2007).
- Inside Running, the sport of art, Fremantle Arts Centre, AU (2013)

=== Performances ===
Pell has performed on various platforms. Among them include:

- The Many-To-Many World, The Great Hall National Gallery of Victoria (1997)
- Training, National Review of Live Art, Midland, Western Australia (2002)
- Second Nature: Second Skin, National Review of Live Art, Glasgow (2003)
- Under Current, Hydrophilia Perth Institute of Contemporary Arts (2003, 2004)
- Hydrophilia', BEAP04 Biennale of Electronic Arts Perth (2004)
- • LifeBoat – mobile life art laboratory – collaboration with Nigel Helyer, Oron Catts and Ionat Zurr, ISEA04 International Symposium of Electronic Arts, The Baltic (2004), Touch Me Festival: OutInOpen, Zargreb (2005)
- Under Current, Bonnington Gallery, UK (2004)
- Petrification – collaboration with Lawrence English, ARC Biennial, Brisbane (2005)
- Hydrophilia, Tract -Live Art Festival, Art Surgery & Newlyn Art Gallery, UK (2006)
- Deep Performance Enhancement, Fremantle Arts Centre, AU (2013)

=== Films ===
Pell has written, produced and performed in her own films. Among them include:

- Walking with Water, 2005. Screened Multimedia Asia Pacific, Bangkok (2005, 2006), Reykjavik Arts Festival, Iceland (2006), DEPOT Danks Street Gallery, Sydney AU (2006),
- ETTAS Showcase, 2012. Premiered European Space Research and Technology Centre [ESTEC], Noordwijk, NL (2012), Free Enterprise: The Art of Citizen Space Exploration, California US (2013)
- We are all Explorer Fish, 2016. Premiered Trondheim Biennale of Art & Technology, Meta.Morf, Norway (2016), International Space Development Conference (2016), Today's Fest, The Hague (2016), KOSMICA, Mexico (2016).

Pell has also acted in feature films including The Tailor of Autumn, by Shaun Wilson, Honey House Films (2015)

=== Occupational diving ===
Pell undertook recreational diver courses at the Perth Diving Academy and qualified as an ADAS 2R Occupational Diver at The Underwater Centre, Fremantle in 2002 to become a third-generation diver following her father and grandfather.

In 2006, Dennis Chamberland invited Pell as Official Artist-Aquanaut of the Atlantica Expeditions undersea habitat mission. Pell was employed as an Onshore Commercial Diver contractor between 2008 and 2012, and logged over 500+ hours performing repetitive black-water operations for the Aquaculture industry in Macquarie Harbour.

In 2013, Pell led Extravehicular activity (EVA) simulation training underwater for the International Space University SHSSP Graduate program with official observer Astronaut Paolo Nespoli. In 2016, Pell was the Simulation Astronaut for the European Commission Project MOONWALK Human analogue missions performing Human-Robotic Collaboration EVA Simulation trials at the Comex Undersea Lunar Analogue site, Marseille, France.

=== Aqueous research ===
Pell has been a professional aqueous researcher for many years. Since 2002, her aqueous research has been shown in galleries, museums and other venues across Australia, Asia, Scandinavia, UK, and Europe.

In 2002, Pell founded the Aquabatics Research Team initiative [ARTi] for performing pneumatic acts and designing and demonstrating prototype-breathing apparatus. She also completed a PhD proposing Aquabatics as new works of Live Art to Edith Cowan University. In 2004, Pell was awarded a Freedman Foundation Travelling Arts Scholarship to research the archives at the Live Art Archive, Nottingham Trent University, the Live Art Development Agency, London and the British Library.

Pell later published Aquabatics as new works of Live art in various formats. In 2007, Leonardo LABS, MIT, awarded Pell the "Best PhD Art & Science".

She was an adjunct lecturer to the University of Western Australia (2005–2007) collaborating with Symbiotica and the Arts Catalyst, on SubCulture: liminal Biosphere. Pell was a visiting research fellow RMIT University (2012–2015), researching interaction design and human computing in novel bodily interfaces suitable for extending human performance experience underwater in the context of exertion games.

=== Everest ===
In 2015, Pell led Bending Horizons Expedition and reached Everest Base Camp intending to summit Mount Everest and make art on-route. She survived the Nepal earthquakes.

=== Astronaut candidate ===
In 2016, Dr. Pell qualified as an Artist-Astronaut Candidate for the suborbital spaceflight aeronomy experiment with Project PoSSUM.

== Other endeavours ==
Pell serves on SeaSpace Boards and Committees. She is a TED Fellow. She was a CoChair of the European Space Agency (ESA), Topical Team Art and Science (ETTAS) 2011–2014. She was also appointed Senior Space Art Consultant to Icarus Interstellar in 2013.

Pell has authored and co-authored several publications. She also visited many space agencies and designed and exhibited on a space-art payload that was launched into orbit with JAXA 2009.

== Awards and honours ==
- 2010 – TED (conference) Fellow
- 2016 – Australia Council Fellow

== Personal life ==
Pell currently resides in Australia and researches extreme performance and aqueous architectures for future use in outer space.

== See also ==
George Cardinal Pell
