= PolakVanBekkum =

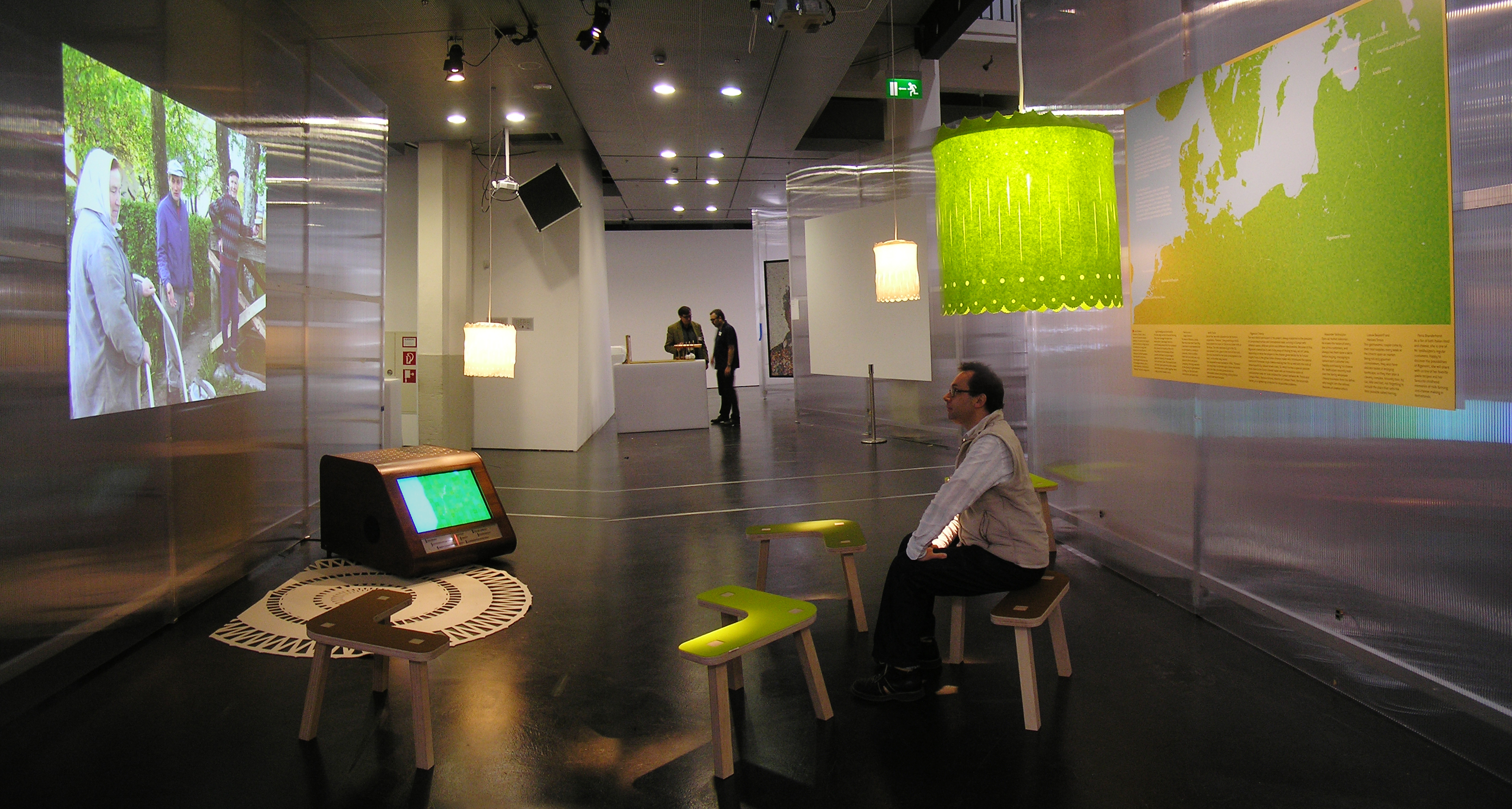
Installation MILKproject (2003)

PolakVanBekkum is a Dutch artist duo consisting of Esther Polak and Ivar van Bekkum. Their media and installation works are based on research of movement in time and space.

PolakVanBekkum was started by Esther Polak (Amsterdam, 1962). She studied painting at the Royal Academy of Art in The Hague, and mixed media at the Rijksakademie of Fine Arts in Amsterdam. Ivar van Bekkum joined in 2008. Van Bekkum (Rotterdam, 1965) studied at the Academy of Journalism in Kampen.

Initially the work of PolakVanBekkum was seen as part of locative media art, when GPS was still a recent technology. The AmsterdamREALTIME (2002) project was one of the first art projects using GPS as an artistic tool. In 2003 Polak worked on the Milkproject, a GPS media project tracing the production process of milk with artist Ieva Auzina. Since 2021 Milkproject is part of the collection of the ZKM Center for Art and Media Karlsruhe.

PolakVanBekkum made several films on the Google Earth and Street View platform. The Ride, premiered at the International Documentary Film Festival Amsterdam in 2019.

== Awards ==
- 2005 Golden Nica for Interactive Art at Ars Electronia, Linz, Austria.
- 2016 The Expanded Media Preis For Network Culture at Stuttgarter Filmwinters - Festival for Expanded Media with The Mailman’s Bag.
- 2017 Golden Calf Nomination for A Collision of Sorts.
