= Gina Czarnecki =

British artist

Gina Czarnecki (born 1965, in Immingham) is a British artist. Her art spans a variety of mediums, including film, sculpture, installation art, and video and is frequently informed by biomedical science. She is the daughter of a Polish father and an English mother. Czarnecki currently resides in Liverpool, England.

Since the start of her career in the early 1980s, she has participated in several group exhibitions including the International Symposium on Electronic Art (ISEA) (1998), Ars Electronica (1999), and the Brisbane Festival for international arts (2009). She has won numerous awards for her work, including the Creative Scotland Award (2002), Fleck Fellowship Banff Centre for Arts and Creativity Award (2004), Australian/New Zealand Best Dance Film Award (2005), and Australian Dance Award for Dance on Film (2005).

Czarnecki's works 'Nascent', 'Cell Mass N2' and 'Infected' were included in the 2010 edition of 'New Frontier' at the Sundance Film Festival. She had a retrospective exhibition at Bluecoat (formerly Bluecoat Chambers) from 9 December 2011 to 19 February 2012, which included the work 'Palaces' commissioned for the exhibition. As a bioartist, Czarnecki's project 'Heirloom', created in collaboration with John Hunt from the University of Liverpool, was included in the exhibition 'No Such Thing as Gravity' at the Foundation for Art and Creative Technology (FACT) in 2017 as well as the Medical Museion (Copenhagen) in 2018. Her sculpture 'Tooth Fairy Palace' was exhibited at the Science Museum, London followed by the Herbert Art Gallery and Museum in Coventry in 2013. Czarnecki's work 'I', employing iris scanning technology, was exhibited as part of the Lumiere light festival in Durham, also 2013.

Czarnecki's works 'Cell Mass 2 and 'Quarantine' were commissioned by Forma UK. Her work Spintex (2008) is held in the Animate Projects archive. Czarnecki's works Tattoo 2 (1991), Parade (1987), Facade (1987) and Moral Judge (1987) are held as part of LUX (formerly London Video Arts).
