= Centro de Cultura Digital =

Cultural center in Mexico City, Mexico

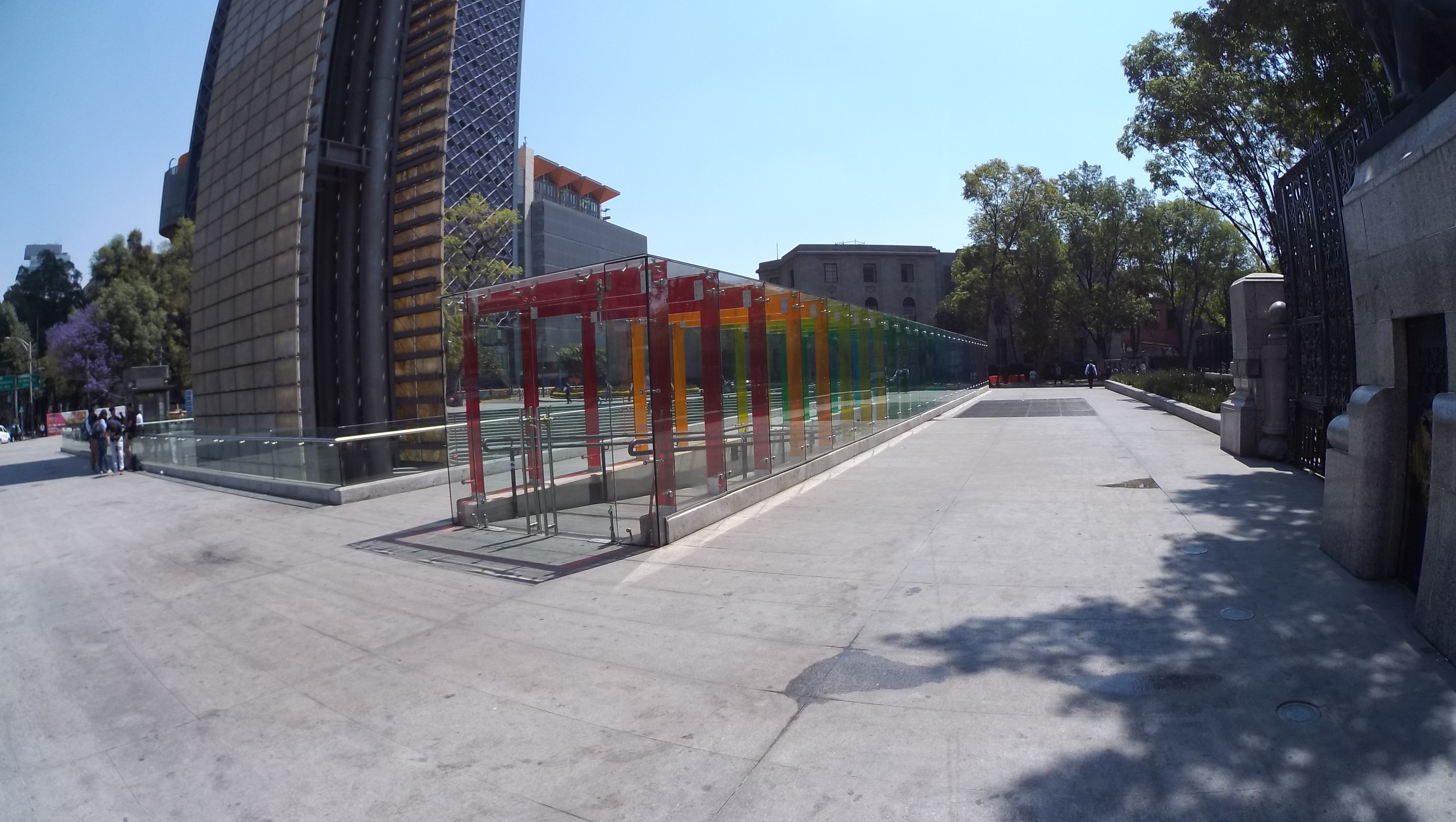
- Entrance
- Established: 2012
- Location: Mexico
- Coordinates: 19°25′22.85″N 99°10′32.73″W
- Type: Cultural
- Director: Mariana Delgado
- Public transit access: Chapultepec metro station

The Centre of Digital Culture (Centro de Cultura Digital, in Spanish) is a multifunctional cultural complex in Mexico City with the vocation to activities of digital art, as well as the promotion of "expressive forms in the digital world" and "his influence in the cultural and artistic life of the country". It was inaugurated on September 16, 2012. The center belongs to Secretariat of Culture. The cultural centre was built under the Estela de Luz.

== Description ==
The Centre of Digital Culture is a physical and virtual space that directs to the general public and devotes to investigate the cultural implications, social and economic of the daily use of the digital technology. It treats, besides, of a forum of communication, artistic creation and entertainment whose aim is to promote the consciousness of what means to live in a world where the individuals are, simultaneously, "users" and "creators" of digital culture.

It is the first governmental initiative in Mexico devoted to spread and cause the production of cultural projects that are born like consequence to live in a technological world.

The cultural centre is built under the Estela de Luz, taking advantage of the spaces in its foundation.

- Terrace: it's used like gallery, with an interactive light wall and exhibitions. The greater part of the work that shows is produced by the interaction with the visitors, that recognise to himself same like producers (factuales or potential) of culture.
- Nellie Campobello Room: cinema and video room, with capacity for 120 people. It has programming of the Cineteca National five days of the week, projects samples of independent festivals and uses like space for conferences.
- Polyvalent space: used for experimental theatre, narration, presentations of books and electronic publications, teaching of workshops and courses with zone of bibliographic query in electronic support.
- Memorial: exhibitions of audible art and light art pieces. In the middle of the space, that is instrumented with multimedia installations, can be observed the pillars of the monument's foundation.

== History ==
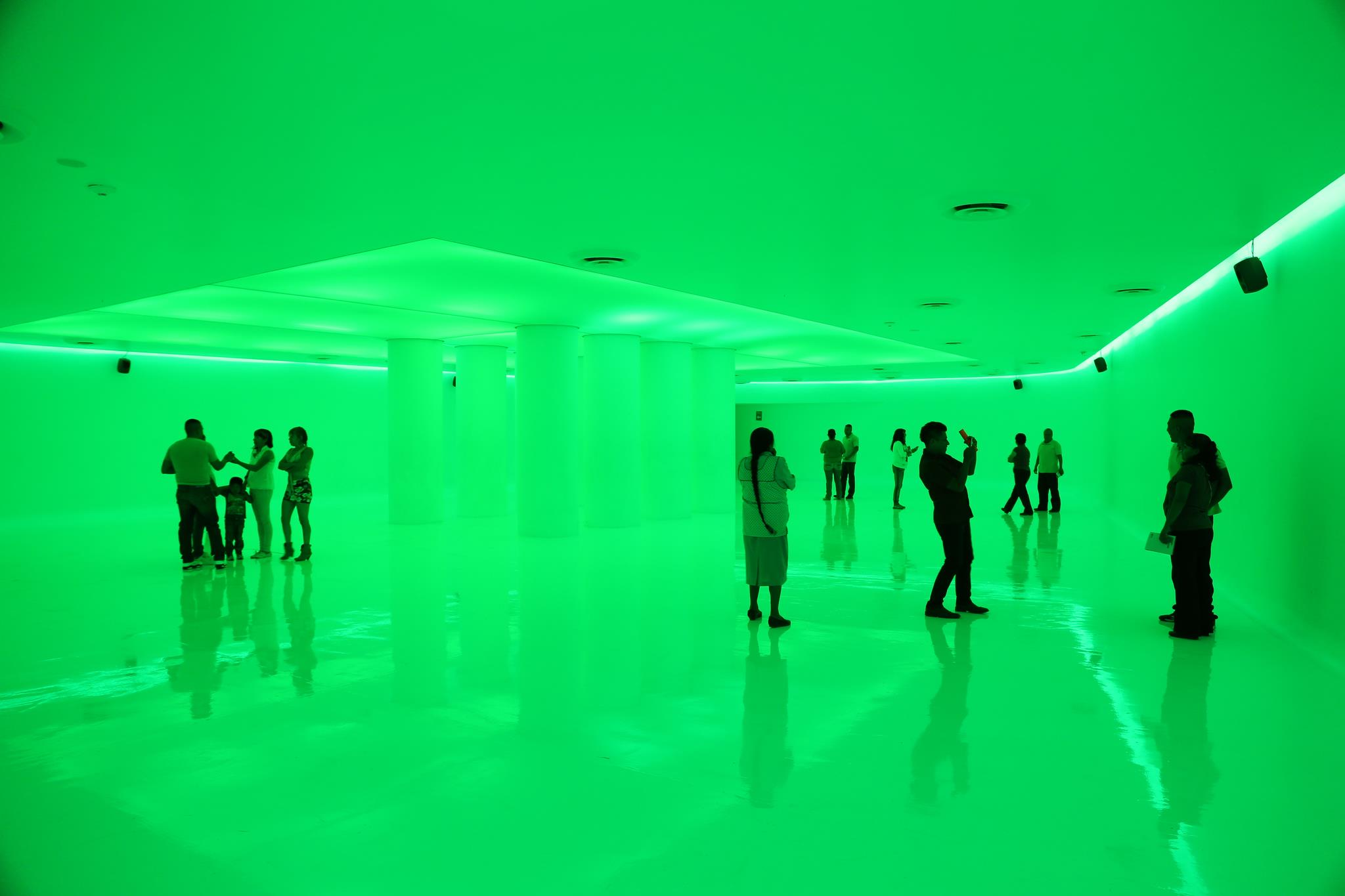
Memorial Space of the CCD

In a first moment, the space would be allocated to an official memorial of the Independence and Mexican Revolution. Afterwards of a controversy aroused by the costs of the Estela de Luz monument, the Mexican government decided to reorient the vocation of the space to a cultural centre in which it gave emphasis to the artistic activities and of learning related with the digital art.

It was inaugurated on 16 September of the 2012 by the current secretary of Public Education, José Ángel Córdova Villalobos, and a concert by Toy Selectah, Rey Pila and Sussie 4, as well as a show of Claudio Valdés Kuri.
