= Leon Vranken =

Belgian artist (born 1975)

Leon Vranken (born 1975, Maaseik, Belgium) is a Belgian artist. He lives and works in Antwerp (Belgium).

== Biography and works ==
Leon Vranken's work is radical in its simplicity and pays tremendous attention to material and finish, expressing both tension and calm. He interweaves expectation with technical expertise. With a background in landscape architecture, after his artistic education in Situ at the Royal Academy of Fine Arts in Antwerp, he has devoted his energies to the visual arts. His diverse works– sculptures, installations, photos or interventions – are mainly developed in interaction with space. Vranken completed his education at the Higher Institute for Fine Arts in Ghent in 2007, and has had international exhibitions in cities including New York, Londen and Toronto.

Leon Vranken is always able to disrupt direct visual recognisability by depriving everyday objects of their function and deliberately using various materials. One could describe his work as sculptural trompe l'oeils, alluring yet misleading configurations. Geometric ensembles, sophisticated sculptures and fake ready-mades are painstakingly orchestrated in space. Shape, presentation and meaning slide continuously over each other like tectonic plates. With his spatial compositions the artist defies gravity, the viewer and the medium. The image enters into dialogue with the frame, the sculpture with the pedestal.

== Solo exhibitions ==
2015

- ( 1³ ) ² = 1, LLS 387 ruimte voor actuele kunst, Antwerp (Belgium)
- Art Geneva, Geneva (Switzerland)

2014

- Paper, Scissors, Stone, Z33, Hasselt (Belgium)

2013

- A Cat's Eye Perspective, Meessen De Clercq, Brussels (Belgium)

2011

- Don't whistle 'till you're out of the wood, White Box, New York (USA)

2010

- The Beauty of Painting (Chapter I), Concertgebouw, Brugge (Belgium)

2009

- The Travelling Riddle, Stella Lohaus Gallery, Antwerpen (Belgium)

2007

- The Garden with the Two-forked Paths, Diaz Contemporary, Toronto (Canada)
- Verger Barré, Maes en Matthys Gallery, Antwerpen (Belgium)

== Sources ==
- L., C. (15 December 2015). "La Française provinciale et l'Américaine du Sud". Arts Libres.
- Steverlynck, Sam (5 June 2014). "Steen, Schaar, Papier". H ART.
- De Baets, Isabelle (1 March 2011). "Wankel evenwicht". OKV.
- Debruyne, Johan (24 June 2010). "Sculptuur wordt schilderij". H ART.
- P.T., R. (4 October 2013). "Léon Vranken ou l'illusion du réel".
