= Art Museum Z33 =

Art centre in Hasselt, Belgium

Coordinates: 50.9321°N 5.3401°E

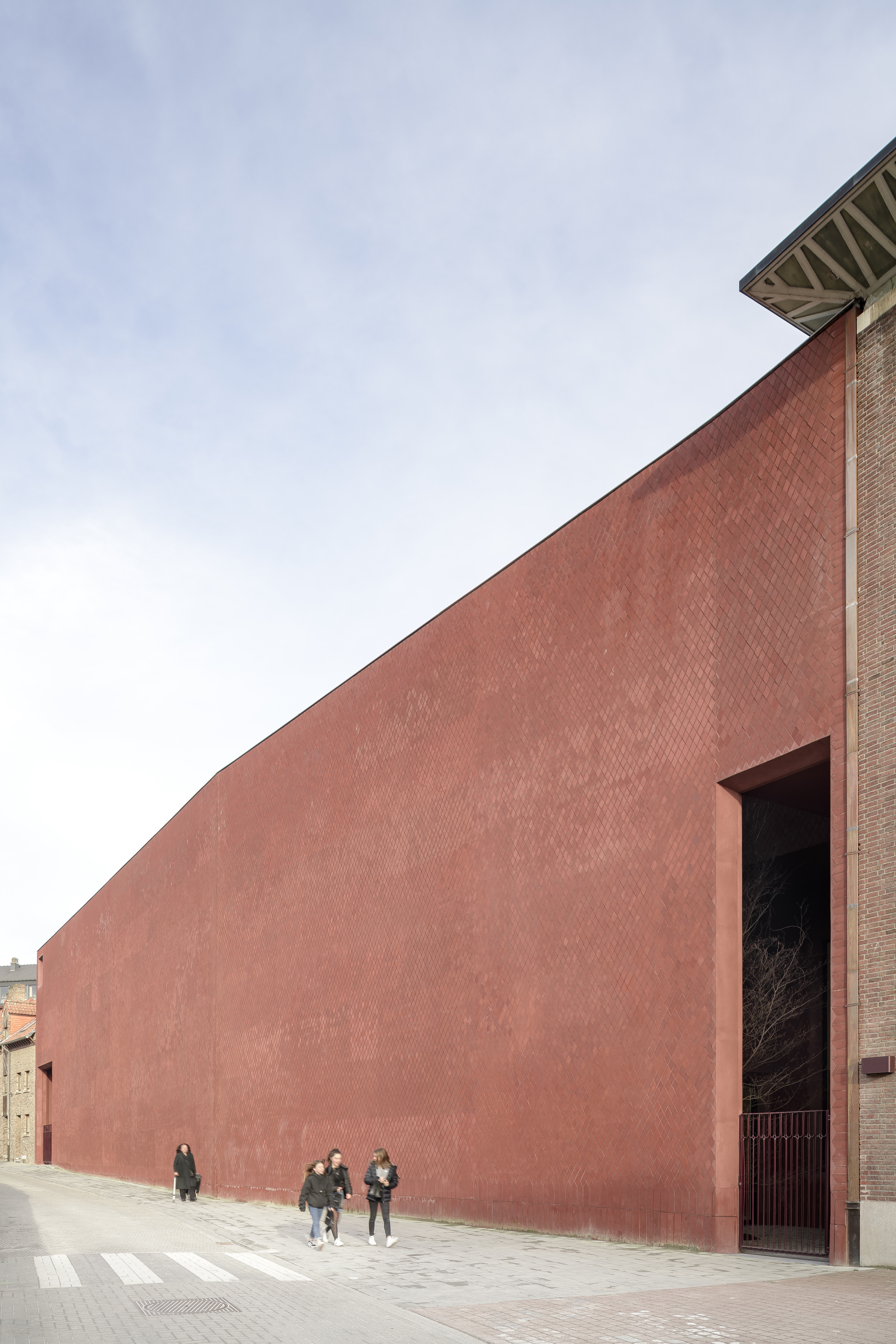
Hasselt, Z33, House of Contemporary Art, Design and Architecture, façade Bonnefantenstraat.

Z33 is an art institution in Hasselt, Belgium that connects art, design and architecture with social themes. Z33 presents itself as an art centre and not as a museum. In fact, the house initiates, produces and displays temporary exhibitions, without a permanent collection. Here, the starting point is the intersection between contemporary art and design. The artistic exhibitions that Z33 creates and presents refer to social developments and scientific phenomena.

== History ==
=== Towards a House for Contemporary Art ===
In 2002, Z33, House for Contemporary Art, evolved out of the PCBK. From then on, the art centre brings contemporary art and design together in thematic projects, with presentations in the beguinage houses and the modernist exhibition building Vleugel 58. As an art institution without a permanent collection, the house presents itself with exhibitions of contemporary art and critical design. In addition, the house focuses on exhibitions addressing social themes, with both artistic and scientific partners and their middle ground. It offers a platform for artists and designers who are on the verge of their breakthrough, doing so with FORMAT (formerly known as Toegepast), a talent development project and with solo exhibitions. From 2008 onwards, the organisation also focuses on art in open space, with the see-through church (Reading Between the Lines) as its best-known realisation.

Since 2006, Z33's activities have been structurally supported by the Flemish Community within the Arts decree. The resources of the Flemish Community allow for a supra-local artistic and public operation. Annually, Z33 receives approximately 30,000 visitors.

In addition, the artistic work often responds to international platforms and biennales. Besides the regular presentation of its work at the design week in Milan, Z33 brought Manifesta 9 to Flanders in 2012. They also acted as curator for the Design Biennale of Ljubljana (2014) and Istanbul (2018), among others. Thanks to the support of the Province of Limburg and the Flemish Community, Z33 is growing into an art institution with international recognition.

On 1 January 2018, Z33 had a transformation. As a result of the internal reform of the Flemish government, the Province of Limburg is no longer responsible for culture. Z33 becomes an independent non-profit organisation with its own staff, which is now also responsible for former provincial tasks. In addition, the house takes on the tasks of four smaller organisations: Cultuurplatform Design, vzw Kunst in Open Ruimte, Platform Kunst in Limburg and vzw KOPIJ.

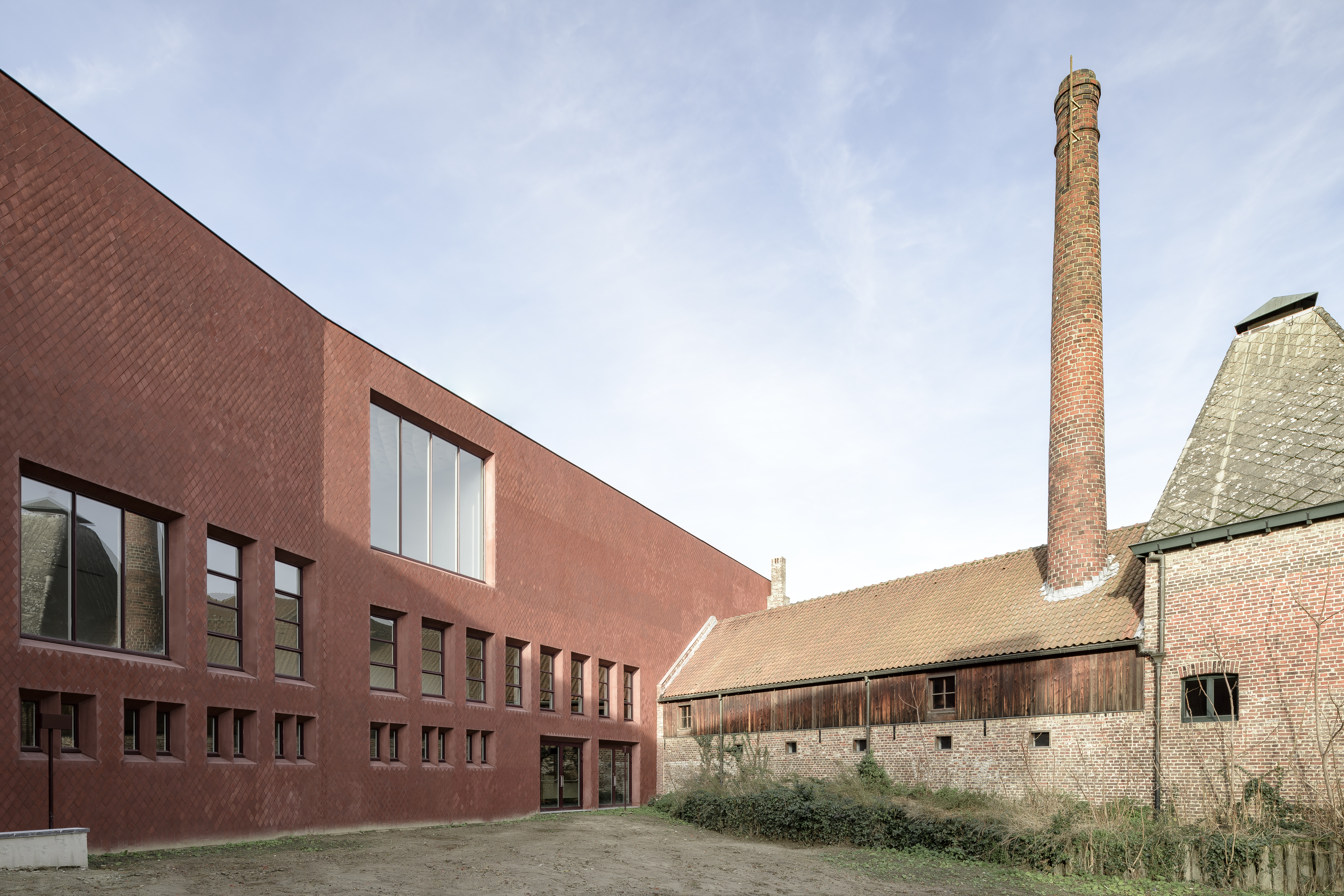
Hasselt, Z33, view on the architecture from the interior of the beguinage. photo taken by Olmo Peeters

=== A new building ===
In January 2020, a completely new chapter starts for Z33 as House for Contemporary Art, Design & Architecture. With the arrival of the new artistic director Adinda Van Geystelen, they closed the chapter in the beguinage permanently. Z33 moves to Bonnefantenstraat 1, where Vleugel 58 and Vleugel 19 merge into one 4,600 m^{2} exhibition space, where three to four exhibitions can be presented simultaneously.

With Vleugel 19, the new exhibition wing by Italian architect Francesca Torzo, Z33 is attracting international attention. The building won the Piranesi Award (2018), the Italian Architecture Prize (2020), the Moira Gemmill Prize for Emerging Architecture (2020) and a nomination for the longlist of the Mies van der Rohe Award 2022. Due to the COVID-19 pandemic, the new Z33 programme started from 21 May 2020.

== Art in public space ==
In terms of art projects in open space, Z33 has been able to make a start with the Art on the Meuse project. After the two previous projects in open space (Pit in Borgloon and the Hasselt-Genk Union ), by 2024 they foresee the realisation of artworks in five Maasland municipalities (Lanaken, Kinrooi, Maasmechelen, Maaseik and Dilsen-Stokkem) on the border with the Netherlands. Just like Pit and the Hasselt-Genk Union Art on the Meuse has the ambition to make stories that are embedded in the landscape visible with artworks that connect with their surroundings in terms of both form and content. In addition, urban anchoring is a focus with, among others, the mural I was here by Pavel Balta in the Ter Hilst district of Hasselt and the social sculpture The Play by Ief Spincemaille in Genk. Finally, they developed the artistic walk Trans & form, hit & run by David Helbich in Hasselt.

In 2020, Z33 was awarded a European subsidy for the project Wanderful.stream, a four-year interdisciplinary innovation trajectory around residual flows from SMEs in the Euregio. In this project, designers, engineers and economists work together towards a more circular economy.

== The building ==
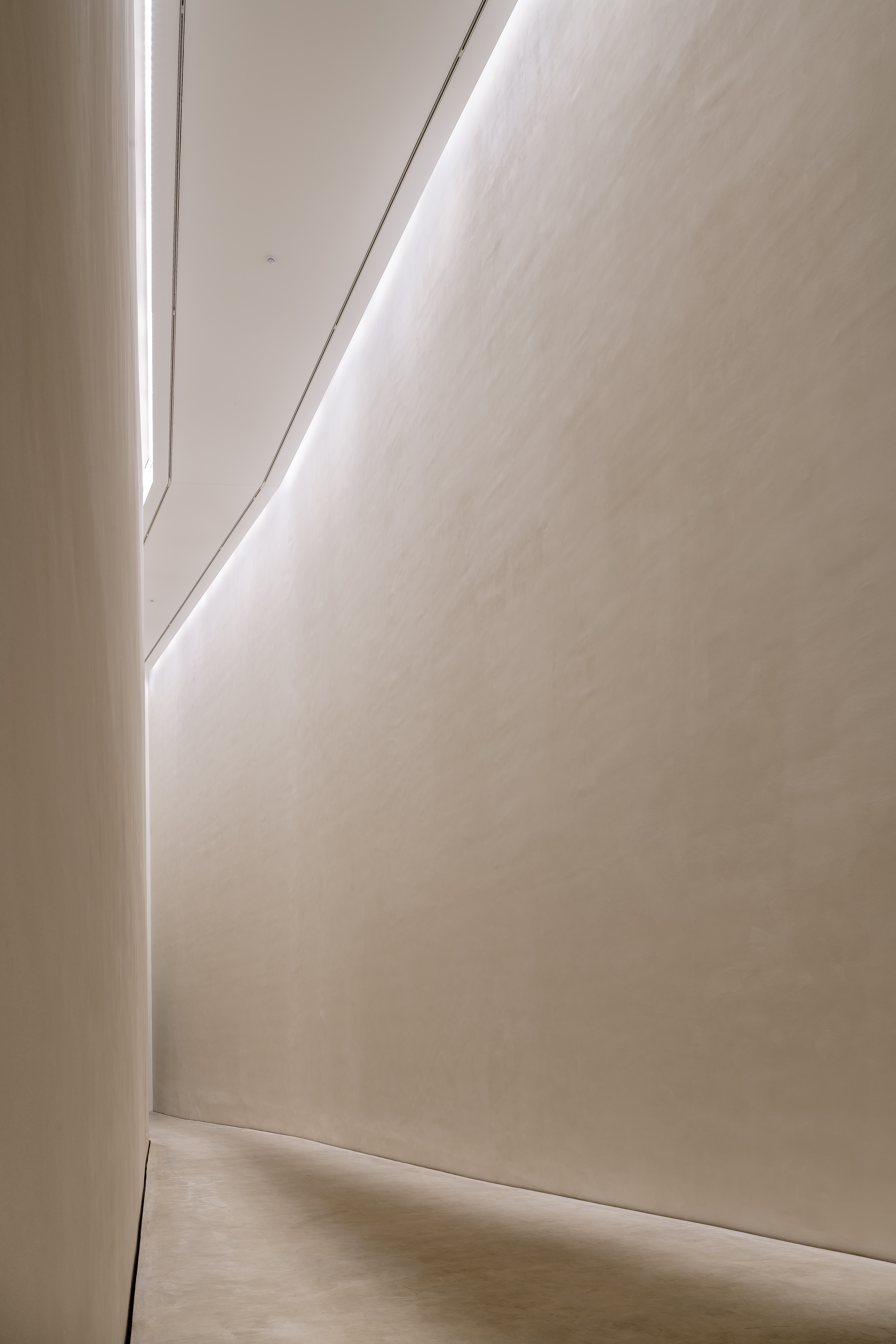
Hasselt, Z33, Exhibition space. Photo taken by Olmo Peeters

Z33 is housed in the former beguinage in Hasselt. In 2020, the existing building was renovated, followed by the construction of a new exhibition wing along the Bonnefantenstraat, Vleugel 19, designed by architect Francesca Torzo. She created a sober and restrained building that fits into the historic urban fabric. The connection to the past, the existing structures, the materials and the attention to craftsmanship are essential. The diamond-shaped brick exterior matches the brick architecture of both the existing exhibition building, Vleugel 58 by architect Gustaaf Daniëls, and the adjoining beguinage. The two wings are different, but complement each other and form an ensemble. They fit like a puzzle between the Jenevermuseum and the historic beguinage site. In the new design, the centre is accessible via Bonnefantenstraat and gives out onto the redesigned beguinage garden. The entire project is budgeted at 8.5 million euros.

The interior consists of a cluster of surprising spaces that turn light red in the sunlight. The slope of the walls at the entrances is 58 degrees, referring to the existing building called Vleugel 58. The visitor experiences the building with all his senses. The variation in exhibition spaces also plays a part in this: one room has no daylight, another is high and narrow, and another is large and wide, with a view of the garden.

== Exhibitions ==
Twice a year, Z33 works out a social theme in its exhibitions and accompanying programme. Attention is paid both to the imagination of visual artists and to applied and concrete solutions by designers and architects. Some major exhibitions from the past are:

- Frederic Geurts (2009)
- Philip Metten (2010)
- Kris Verdonck (2011)
- Mind The System, Find The Gap (2012)
- Space Odyssey 2.0 (2013)
- Sarah & Charles (2013)
- Leon Vrankcen (2014)
- Konstantin Gric (2015)
- Perpetual Uncertainty (2017)
- Tomás Saraceno (2017)
- Toegepast (2017)
- The Work of Time (2020)
- The Time of Work (2020)
- Palms, Palms, Palms (2021)
- Le Déracinement (2021)
- In the Eye of the Storm (2022)
- Mae-ling Lokko (2022)

== See also ==
- List of design museums
