= Honor Harger =

New Zealand artist (born 1975)

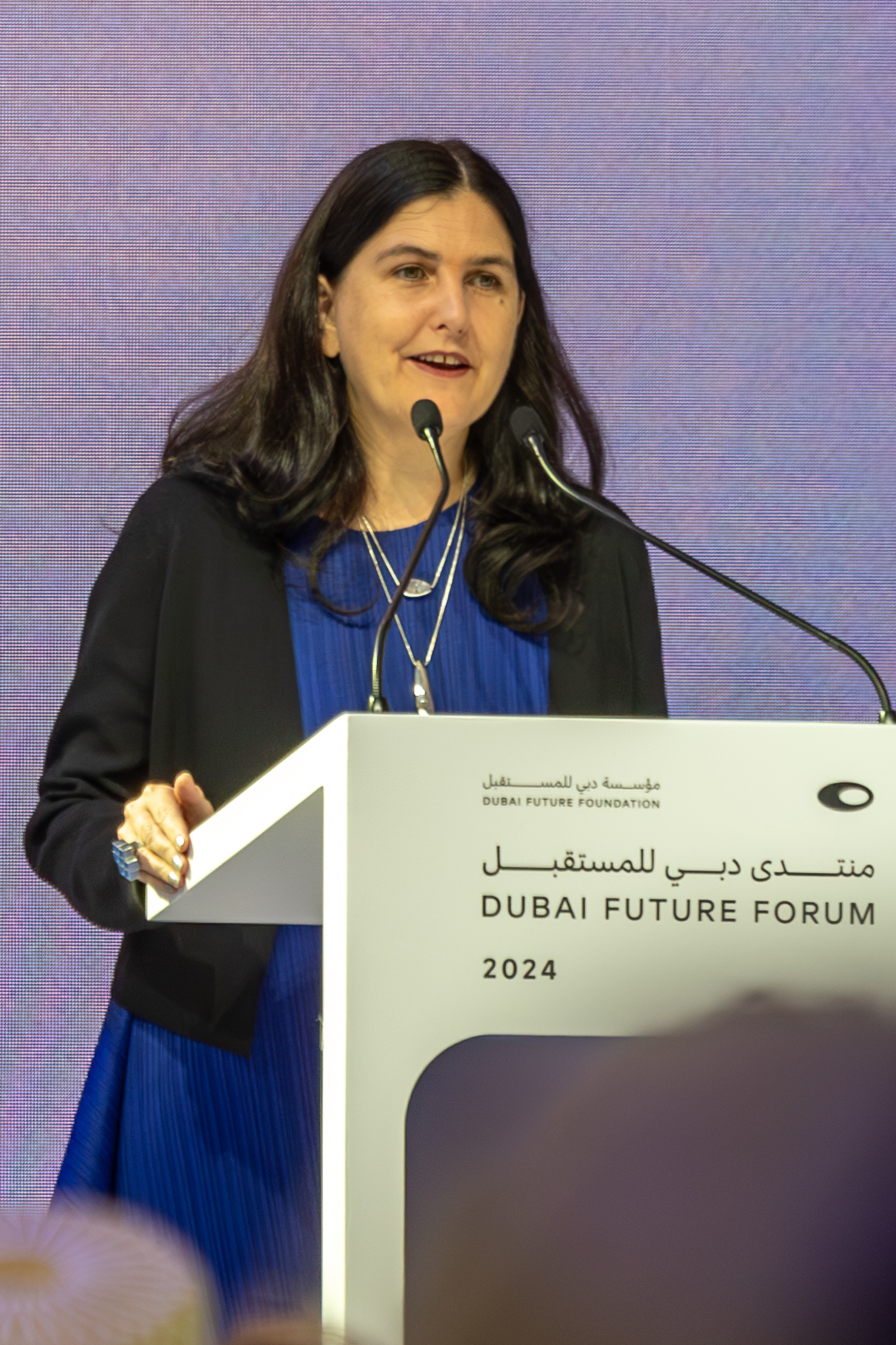
- Harger at the Dubai Future Forum (2024)
- Born: 1975 (age 50–51); Dunedin, New Zealand
- Occupations: Executive Director of the ArtScience Museum, Singapore

Honor Harger (born 1975 in Dunedin) is a curator and artist from New Zealand. Harger has a particular interest in artistic uses of new technologies. She is currently the executive director of the ArtScience Museum in Singapore.

Harger was included in The Guardian's 'The Hospital Club 100 list' for 2013, which lists innovative and influential people in the creative industries.

== Career ==
=== Early career ===
In the mid-1990s, while based in New Zealand, Honor edited the artistic publication, SPeC; co-founded sound art collective Relay, worked with student radio station, Radio One and with the art gallery, Artspace (New Zealand). In 1997, she relocated to Australia to work with the Australian Network for Art and Technology, before relocating to Europe in 1999 and then Singapore in 2014.

=== r a d i o q u a l i a ===
Harger is one of the co-founders (with Adam Hyde in 1998) of r a d i o q u a l i a, a group which explores how broadcasting technologies can create new artistic forms and how audio can be used to illuminate abstract ideas and processes. They have exhibited at museums, galleries and festivals, including: NTT ICC, Tokyo; New Museum, New York; Gallery 9, Walker Art Center, USA; Sónar, Barcelona; FACT centre in Liverpool; Ars Electronica, Linz, Austria; Experimental Art Foundation, Australia; Maison Européenne de la Photographie, Paris; and the Physics Room, New Zealand.

One of the collective's main projects is Radio Astronomy, an art and science project which broadcasts sounds intercepted from space live on the internet and on the airwaves. The project is achieved in collaboration with radio telescopes around the world. The signal from objects observed by these partner telescopes is converted into audio and then broadcast. Radio Astronomy has three parts: a sound installation, a live on-air radio transmission, and a live online radio broadcast. Depending on what is being observed by the telescopes, examples of what listeners may hear includes radiation from the Sun, or the planet Jupiter and its interaction with its moons.

The first exhibition of Radio Astronomy was at ISEA2004, Helsinki, August 2004. The second exhibition was at the Ars Electronica festival of art and technology in Linz, Austria, in September 2004.

=== AV Festival ===
From 2004 to 2008, Honor Harger was the artistic director of the AV Festival an international festival of electronic art, that features new media art, film, music, and games. The bi-annual festival takes place in the cities of Newcastle/Gateshead, Sunderland and Middlesbrough in the North East of England.

=== Lighthouse ===
Harger was the director of Lighthouse from 2010 to 2014. Lighthouse is a leading arts agency in Brighton, England supporting, commissioning and showcasing new work by artists and filmmakers. During her four-year tenure, Lighthouse presented shows from artists such as Trevor Paglen, David Blandy and Timo Arnall and commissioned new work from James Bridle, Semiconductor and The Otolith Group.

=== ArtScience Museum ===
In February 2014, Harger became Executive Director of the ArtScience Museum in Singapore. One of her key aims has been to clearly define the museum's identity, as an institution that explores the intersection and unity of art and science.

Programs launched under Harger's directorship include ArtScience Late, a monthly evening program featuring specially commissioned live performance by artists and technologists from varying backgrounds. Exhibitions include 'Da Vinci: Shaping the Future'. This exhibition presented selected works by Leonardo da Vinci for the first time in Southeast Asia. It also included five contemporary art installations, including three new commissions, exploring how Leonardo's ideas continue to resonate with artists today.

== Curation ==
After relocating to Europe in 1999, Harger undertook projects with the Bauhaus Dessau Foundation in Germany, the publishing house Arkzin in Croatia, and the Kiasma contemporary art museum in Finland. From 2000 to 2003, she worked for Tate Modern in London as the Webcasting Curator within Tate's Digital Programmes department and has also produced events and concerts for the Interpretation and Education department at Tate Modern.

She has worked as a freelance curator on exhibitions and events, including art.net.uk/now for the British Council in India in 2002 and Dots and Lines for the BBC and Sonic Arts Network in 2005.

Harger was the guest curator for the Transmediale festival in Berlin in 2010.

== Writing ==
From 2008 to 2014 Harger wrote the blog Particle Decelerator with news of science, art and technology, placing a special emphasis on the collision between the quantum and the cosmological.

== Appearances ==
Honor Harger has lectured extensively and spoken publicly on her work in a variety of forums. Some of these include:

- LIFT in Geneva
- European Space Agency
- the Centre Pompidou in Paris
- California Institute of the Arts
- the American Film Institute
- TED Talks: Honor Harger: A history of the universe in sound, TEDSalon London, Spring 2011
- Honor Harger: Unmanned Aerial Ecologies, Goldsmith's University of London, 16 January 2014
- Public Seminar With Honor Harger, SymbioticA, University of Western Australia, 12 September 2014
- Landing on a Comet, Webstock, 19 February 2015

== See also ==
- AV Festival
- r a d i o q u a l i a
- New media art
- New Media art festivals
- Electronic art
