= Bompas & Parr =

Food arts in the United Kingdom

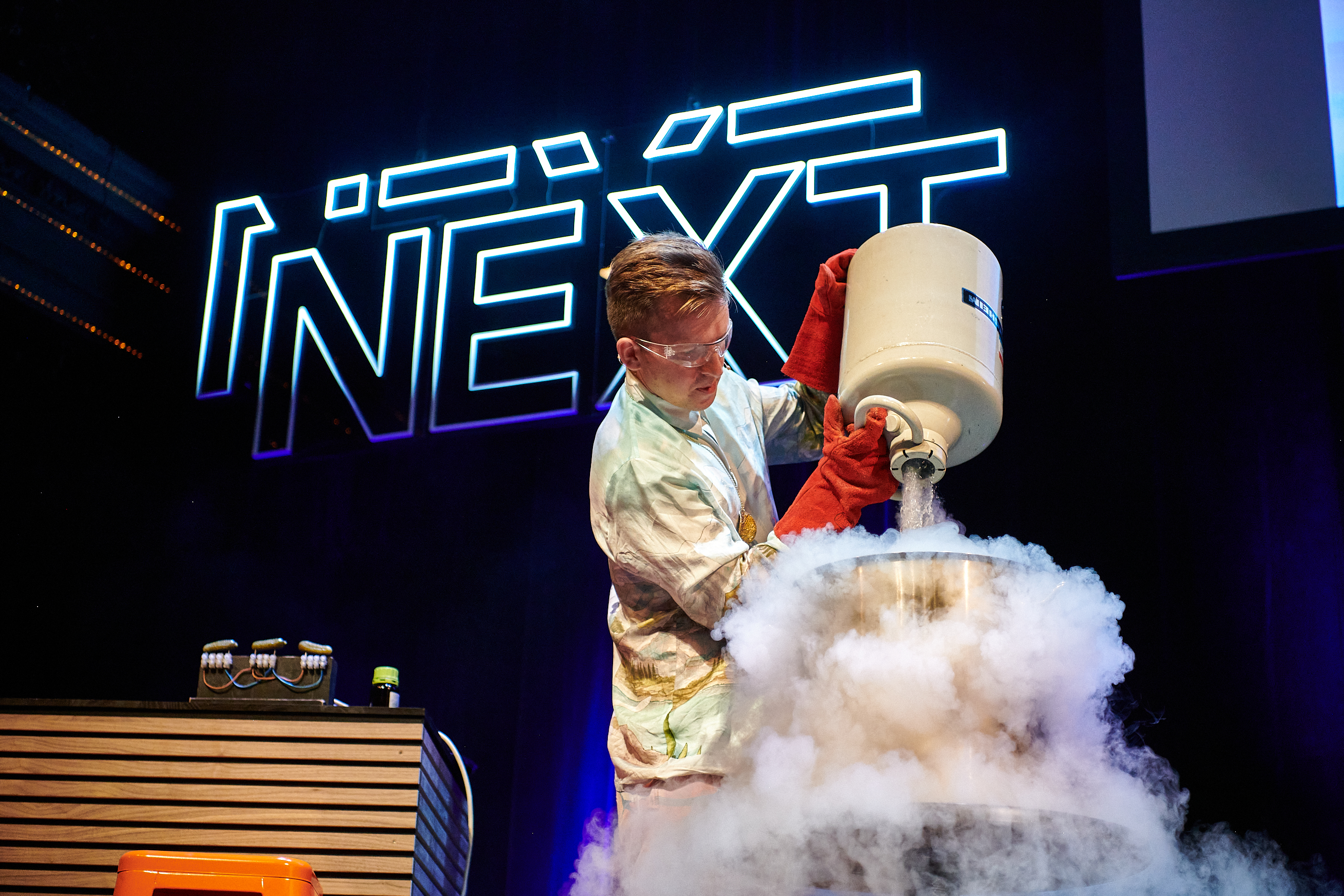
Sam Bompas performing molecular gastronomy with liquid nitrogen

Bompas & Parr is a British food and beverage company focused on creating food art using gelatin desserts, colloquially called jellies. It was founded June 2007 by Sam Bompas and Harry Parr. The company uses food moulds to make edible decorations shaped like buildings and other architectural structures.

The work of Bompas & Parr has been noted for its detail and the company has competed in culinary artwork competitions, an example being the Architectural Jelly Design Competition organised for the London Festival of Architecture. The company claims their projects explore how the taste of food is altered through synaesthesia, performance and setting. Bompas & Parr claim to be the first group to ever record the sound of jelly wobbling.

== History ==
Bompas and Parr met when they were both 13 and in the orchestra at Eton College during the 1990s. They decided to go into business together when they were both in their last year of university. Projects have included a glow-in-the-dark alcoholic jelly for Mark Ronson's 33rd birthday party and a Willy Wonka-style chewing gum that changes flavour as it is chewed.

In July 2011, Bompas & Parr designed a public art installation on the roof terrace of Selfridges, Oxford Street, for a promotional event. The first time that the roof had been opened to the public since World War II, the company designed a rowing lake, which was dyed green.

As part of the nationwide activity marking the London 2012 Open Weekend Bompas & Parr created scratch and sniff cards to accompany a one-off scratch and sniff screening of Bill Forsyth's film Gregory's Girl in Edinburgh's Festival Square on Sunday 26 July 2009. This is thought to be the first outdoor scratch and sniff experience anywhere in the UK. An enigmatic penguin (familiar to devotees of the film) appeared amongst the crowd holding up a placard instructing the audience to scratch and sniff at the right moment.

On 30 July 2015 at London's Borough Market the company took over an ancient monastery next to the market for a pop-up named Alcoholic Architecture. Visitors consumed vapourised alcohol through their skin, eyes and lungs in an immersive, multi sensory environment.
