= Aleksandra Mir =

Swedish-American contemporary artist (born 1967)

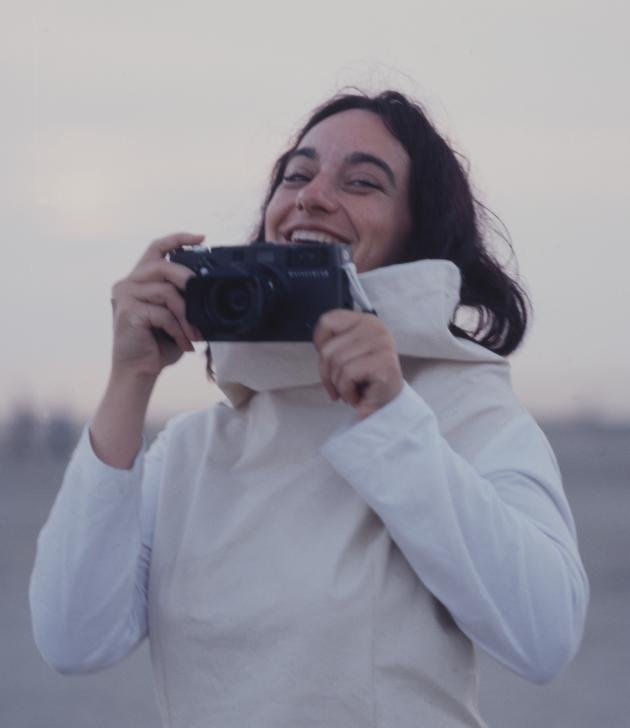
- Mir in 1999
- Born: 1967 (age 58–59); Lubin, Poland
- Awards: Baloise Art Prize (2004); Pollock-Krasner Foundation (2018)
- Website: aleksandramir.info aleksandraprints.com

Aleksandra Mir (born 1967) is a Swedish-American contemporary artist known for creating works that integrate elements of art, science, and cultural history. Over a three-decade career, she has exhibited worldwide, including at the Whitney Museum of American Art and the Venice Biennale, and her work is held in major public collections such as the Tate, Moderna Museet, Kunsthaus Zürich, and the Solomon R. Guggenheim Museum.

She employs anthropological methods such as archival research, oral history, and fieldwork in a practice that spans drawing, collage, performance, and large-scale public projects, combining intellectual rigor with striking visual impact.

== Work ==
In First Woman on the Moon (1999), Mir converted a Dutch beach into a moonscape for one day with the help of bulldozers. The video of this event has been presented at multiple venues, at the International Space University, Strasbourg and at the UK Space Conference, Liverpool, 2015.

The How Not to Cookbook, (Collective Gallery, Edinburgh, 2009 and Rizzoli, NYC 2010) collected advice from 1,000 home cooks from around the world who explained what not to do in the kitchen.

In 2002, Mir painted the Mandela Way T-34 Tank pink with Cubitt Artists.

For Newsroom 1986–2000 (2007), Mir with a group of assistants copied 240 NYC tabloid covers in felt-tip marker and mounted them in an ever-revolving installation to simulate the daily workings of a Manhattan newsroom. Mir has created a series of large scale murals using only Sharpie marker pens.

In Triumph she collected 2529 trophies from the general public of Sicily and exhibited them all in one installation at the Schirn Kunsthalle, Frankfurt (2009). It traveled to the South London Gallery for the London Olympics in 2012.

Mir has created Plane Landing (2003), a real size helium inflatable jet plane, meant not to fly, but to hover above the ground as "a sculpture of a jet plane in a permanent state of landing". In 2023 Kunsthaus Zurich acquired the work for its permanent collection, having previously staged it at the tarmac of the Zurich airport.

Mir's Dream and Promise collages (2009) combine antique religious and modern scientific imagery into a new fantastical reality. The print series (2025) reproduces an aged authentic patina and the imprint of the artist’s hand-crafted marks.

== Selected exhibitions ==
=== Solo ===
- 2021–22: Mediterranean, Inhotim, Belo Horizonte
- 2019: The Pre-Presidential Library of the United States, Hayward Gallery, London
- 2017: Space Tapestry: Faraway Missions, Tate Liverpool
- 2017: Space Tapestry: Earth Observation & Human Spaceflight, Modern Art Oxford
- 2014: Drawing Room, Drawing Room, London
- 2013: The Space Age, M – Museum Leuven
- 2011: The Seduction of Galileo Galilei, Whitney Museum of American Art, New York
- 2009: Triumph, Schirn Kunsthalle, Frankfurt
- 2006: Switzerland and Other Islands, Kunsthaus Zurich

=== Group ===
- 2024: Images, Vevey
- 2023: Chengdu Biennale, Chengdu
- 2022: New Acquisitions, Moderna Museet, Stockholm
- 2020: Topologia Salvaje, Colección Jumex, Mexico City
- 2018: The Artist is Present, YUZ Museum, Shanghai
- 2013: Mercosul Biennial, Porto Alegre
- 2012: Print/Out, MoMA – The Museum of Modern Art, New York
- 2009: Making Worlds, La Biennale di Venezia, Venice
- 2004: Whitney Biennial, New York

== Publications ==
Mir has published numerous artists books, exhibition catalogues and magazine titles in collaboration with other artists, editors and publishers and under her own imprint, the Retrospective Press.

- 2026: Plane Landing Vevey, Aleksandra Mir, Images Vevey / Retrospective Press, London ISBN 978-2-940624-37-9
- 2023: Freddie on the Plinth, Aleksandra Mir & Irena Sedlecká, Retrospective Press, London ISBN 978-1-9993208-3-6
- 2022: BAD Reviews: an Artists' Book by 150 Artists, eds. Aleksandra Mir & Tim Griffin, Retrospective Press, London ISBN 978-1-9993208-2-9
- 2019: The Pre-Presidential Library of the United States, Aleksandra Mir, Retrospective Press, London ISBN 978-1-9993208-0-5
- 2017: We Can't Stop Thinking about the Future: Artist Aleksandra Mir Speaks with the Space World, Strange Attractor Press, London / MIT Press, Cambridge, MA ISBN 978-1-907222-54-2
- 2013: The Space Age, Aleksandra Mir & Martin Herbert, M – Museum Leuven / Sternberg Press, Berlin
- 2010: The How Not to Cookbook, 2nd Edition, eds. Aleksandra Mir, Mareike Dittmer, Pablo León de la Barra, et al., Rizzoli International Publications, NYC
- 2009: The How Not to Cookbook, 1st Edition, eds. Aleksandra Mir, Mareike Dittmer, Pablo León de la Barra, et al., the Collective Gallery, Edinburgh
- 2008: Triumph, Aleksandra Mir, Verlag der Buchhandlung Walther König / Schirn Kunsthalle, Frankfurt ISBN 978-3-86560-576-4
- 2007: Love Stories, Aleksandra Mir, Fundacion NMAC, Vejer de la Frontera
- 2007: Sicilian Pavilion, Aleksandra Mir, Fondazione Sambuca, Palermo
- 2007: Gravity: The Eternal Countdown, Aleksandra Mir & Ken Hollings, The Arts Catalyst, London
- 2007: Newsroom 1989–2000, Aleksandra Mir, Mary Boone Gallery, NYC
- 2007: LA: A Geography of Modern Art, Aleksandra Mir & Justin Beal, Printed Matter, NYC
- 2007: The Big Umbrella, Aleksandra Mir, Galerie Laurent Godin / Onestar Press ISBN 978-2-915359-30-5
- 2006: Switzerland and Other Islands, Aleksandra Mir, Kunsthaus Zurich / Edition Fink, Zurich ISBN 978-3-03746-100-6
- 2006: The Concorde Collages, Aleksandra Mir, Galerie Laurent Godin / Onestar Press, Paris ISBN 978-2-915359-20-6
- 2006: 105 selected details from the Sharpie drawings 2003–2006, Aleksandra Mir, Onestar Press, Paris
- 2006: Living & Loving #3—The Biography of Mitchell Wright, eds. Aleksandra Mir & Polly Staple, White Columns, New York ISBN 978-0-9552848-0-9
- 2005: The Meaning of Flowers, Aleksandra Mir, Gavlak, Palm Beach / Sternberg Press, Berlin ISBN 978-1-933128-23-8
- 2004: The Church of Sharpie, Aleksandra Mir, Galeria Joan Prats, Barcelona
- 2004: Che and Concorde, Aleksandra Mir, Whitney Biennial, The Whitney Museum of American Art, New York
- 2004: Che and Concorde, Aleksandra Mir & Jim Fitzpatrick, Project Art Space, Dublin
- 2004: Living & Loving #2—The Biography of Zoe Stillpass, eds. Aleksandra Mir & Polly Staple, Frieze Projects, London
- 2003: Finding Photographs, Aleksandra Mir, Herning Kunstmuseum ISBN 978-87-88367-40-9
- 2003: Danes in the Sun, Aleksandra Mir, Herning Kunstmuseum
- 2003: How to be a Joshua Tree, Aleksandra Mir, High Desert Test Sites, Joshua Tree
- 2003: Corporate Mentality, eds. Aleksandra Mir & John Kelsey, Lukas & Sternberg Inc. New York ISBN 978-0-9711193-1-4
- 2002: Daily News, ed. Aleksandra Mir, Gavin Brown's enterprise, NYC / greengrassi, London
- 2002/2012: Man with Artificial Heart, Aleksandra Mir, NYC/London
- 2002: Living & Loving #1—The Biography of D.C., eds. Aleksandra Mir & Polly Staple, Cubitt, London / Dundee Contemporary Arts, Dundee ISBN 978-0-9532765-1-6
- 2001: HELLO Ringier, Aleksandra Mir, Ringier, Zurich
- 1998: Bingo Blues, Aleksandra Mir, Transmission Gallery, Glasgow
- 1998: Disaster Guide, Cinema for the Unemployed, Aleksandra Mir, Momentum, Moss

== Personal life ==
Mir was born in Lubin, Poland in 1967. Her Polish citizenship was revoked during the 1968 Polish political crisis. She holds dual Swedish-American citizenship. She grew up in Sweden, where she studied at the University of Gothenburg. She moved to the United States in 1989 to attend the School of Visual Arts in New York and studied cultural anthropology at the Graduate Faculty of the New School for Social Research. Mir lived in Palermo, Sicily from 2005 to 2010. Currently, Mir lives in London.
