= Carey Young =

British artist

- Born: Carey Young; 1970 (age 55–56); Lusaka, Zambia
- Education: Royal College of Art, London
- Known for: Contemporary art Video art Photography Installation art
- Website: https://www.careyyoung.com/

Carey Young (born 1970) is a visual artist whose work uses a variety of media including video, photography, text and installation. Her work often examines and questions the reach of the legal and commercial spheres and their ability to shape contemporary reality. Since 2017, she has created two films featuring female judges in order to examine the interrelationships of law, fiction and gender. Young teaches at the Slade School of Fine Art in London where she is a Professor in Fine Art.

== Early life and education ==
Born in Lusaka in Zambia in 1970, Young grew up in Manchester, England and studied at Manchester Polytechnic, the University of Brighton; she then gained a Masters in Photography at the Royal College of Art in London. She has dual US/UK citizenship and lives and works in London, UK.

== Exhibitions and themes ==
Exhibitions of Young's work include solo exhibitions at Modern Art Oxford, Dallas Museum of Art, Migros Museum of Contemporary Art, The Power Plant, the Contemporary Art Museum St. Louis, and inclusion in group exhibitions at Centre Pompidou, Tate Britain, the Whitechapel Art Gallery, the Hayward Gallery, Secession, Kunstverein München, Mass MOCA, MoMA PS1, Jeu de Paume and the Venice, Moscow, Taipei, Tirana and Busan Biennials.

Young's work is included in the public collections of the Centre Pompidou, Arts Council England, Dallas Museum of Art, and Tate.

'Disclaimer', a 2003 exhibition at the Henry Moore Institute examined legal disclaimers as a form of negative space. In 2005, she showed 'Consideration', a series of works exploring the connections between contract law and performance art at Paula Cooper Gallery in New York as part of the PERFORMA05 Biennial. Noted performance art curator RoseLee Goldberg described the works in this show as "dealing with the overwhelming power of the law."

Her 2013 exhibition "Legal Fictions" at Migros Museum in Zurich was described by Mousse Magazine as featuring:

"Law-based works [that] address the monolithic power of the legal system. The artist examines law as a conceptual and abstract space in which power, rights, and authority are played out through varying forms of performance and language. With the drafting assistance of legal advisers, her works often take the form of experimental but functional legal instruments such as contracts, and also employ media such as video, installation, and text".

Her 2017 video installation Palais de Justice, at Paula Cooper Gallery was described by critic Jeffrey Kastner as: “quietly stunning … vividly proposes a juridical world as it might otherwise be, a form of the Law that may someday be possible.” Johanna Fateman, writing for Artforum, described the work as: "a transfixing (...) speculative fiction", a "tantalising (...) novel mockup of a post-patriarchal legal system."

Laura Cumming, of The Observer, said "Young’s profound and involving examination of the law has continued through film, photography and installation art for more than 20 years. (...) The laws that govern our rights, our agency and even our movements in this world are, for Young, 'a form of choreography'."

Critic and curator Toby Kamps said Young's "Text works take legal premises to their logical extremes to show the malleability and potential in legal codes. Her photographs and videos pull telling details and new social formations from the flux of life. Her genius is her ability to deftly rearrange the ideas and the stuff of everyday life to envision new realities and possibilities—openings in the (man-made) systems that so often box us in."

== Selected solo exhibitions ==
- 2024 Appearance, Paula Cooper Gallery, New York
- 2023 Appearance, Modern Art Oxford
- 2020 The Vision Machine, Kunsthal Aarhus, Denmark
- 2017 The New Architecture, Dallas Museum of Art, Dallas
- 2013 Legal Fictions, Migros Museum für Gegenwartskunst, Zurich
- 2009 Speech Acts, Contemporary Art Museum St. Louis

== Other publications ==
Young's work has been included in numerous publications and a number of videos and audio recordings.

=== Selected periodicals ===
- Cumming, Laura, 'Carey Young: Appearance review – the faces of female justice', The Observer, 26 March 2023
- Fateman, Johanna, "Carey Young at Paula Cooper", Artforum, Nov 2017
- Farago, Jason, 'Palais de Justice', New York Times, 20 Sept 2017
- Bryan-Wilson, Julia. 'Inside Job: Julia Bryan-Wilson on the art of Carey Young,' Artforum, Oct 2010
- Bell, Natalie, 'Carey Young', Art Papers, March/April 2008
- Schwabsky, Barry, "Carey Young", Artforum, Sept 2005
- Smith, Roberta, "The Passions of the Good Citizen", The New York Times, 3 May 2002

=== Web articles ===
- Kastner, Jeffrey, Garage magazine (Vice magazine), Oct 2017
- Bourbon, Matthew, 'Critic's Pick: Carey Young at Dallas Museum of Art', Artforum.com, Feb 2017
- Shore, Robert, and Young, Carey, 'Interview with Carey Young: “Friendly, Honest, Straightforward”: Meditations on Power', Elephant magazine, Feb 2017
- Goldberg, RoseLee and Stallman, Nick, "Conversations..with RoseLee Goldberg', New York Foundation for the Arts, 2005
- Baker, R.C., 'The Road to Dystopia', Village Voice, 2007

=== Books ===
- Buskirk, Martha; Gygax, Raphael; Young, Carey and Zolghadr, Tirdad, in 'Carey Young: Subject to Contract', JRP Ringier and Migros Museum of Contemporary Art, Zurich, London, 2013
- Farquharson, Alex; Gillick, Liam and Young, Carey; Kelsey, John and Millar, Jeremy, in 'Carey Young, Incorporated', John Hansard Gallery and Film & Video Umbrella, London, 2002
- Nochlin, Linda, in Global Feminisms, Brooklyn Museum, New York, 2007
- Bourriaud, Nicolas, in Moscow Biennale 7 catalogue, Moscow, 2007
- Hoffman, Jens in 'Institutional Critique and After', edited by John C. Welchman, JRP/Ringier, Zürich, 2006
- Newman, Michael, in 'How to Improve the World', Hayward Gallery, London, 2006
- Townsend, Chris, 'New Art from London', Thames and Hudson, London, 2006
- Farquharson, Alex, Schlieker, Andrea, and Mahony, Emma in 'British Art Show 6', Hayward Gallery Publishing, London, 2005
- Latour, Bruno and Weibel, Peter, 'Making Things Public', ZKM and the MIT Press, Karlsruhe & Cambridge, 2005
- Hoffmann, Jens and Jonas, Joan, 'Art Works: Perform', Thames and Hudson, London, 2005
- Kimbell, Lucy (ed), 'New Media Art: Practice and Content in the UK 1994–2004', Arts Council of England / Cornerhouse publications, London, 2004

=== Videos about the artist ===
- Artist's website (video interview with the artist about her law-based works, Jan 2024; duration 4 mins 20 secs)
- Centre Pompidou (Artist talk in English, with French translation,17 May 2010; duration 1hr 51 mins)
- Contemporary Art Museum St. Louis (introductory video by curator, 2010; duration 6 mins 45 secs)
