= Agnes Meyer-Brandis =

German installation artist

Agnes Meyer-Brandis in 2026

Agnes Meyer-Brandis (born 1973) is a German installation artist, known for her Moon Goose Colony, an internationally exhibited artwork and film in which (inspired by a story by Francis Godwin) she raises a flock of geese and teaches them to become astronauts.

After briefly studying mineralogy at the RWTH Aachen University, Meyer-Brandis studied sculpture at the Maastricht Academy of Fine Arts in the Netherlands, studied with Czech photographer and conceptual artist Magdalena Jetelová at the Kunstakademie Düsseldorf in Düsseldorf, Germany, and then earned a master's degree in audio visual media from the Academy of Media Arts Cologne in Cologne, Germany.

Meyer-Brandis' other artworks include her Iceberg Probe, which won first prize at transmediale 2006, a 2008 installation investigating from an artistic point of view the effects of a total solar eclipse on a zoo in Novosibirsk, and a project in association with the city of Yekaterinburg at the third Moscow Biennale in 2009. In 2014 Meyer-Brandis takes part at exhibition 'The Invisible Force Behind.' at Imai – inter media art institute within Quadriennale Düsseldorf.

Since then, she has also held additional solo exhibitions, including the “One Tree-ID” exhibition (Ljubljana 2022, Zagreb 2023) and “As Trees Go By” (Mänttä, Finland), in which she explores in depth the scent of trees and their interaction with the environment.

In addition to her current exhibitions, Agnes Meyer-Brandis serves as a visiting professor and lecturer at various universities and institutes, including the International Space University (ISU) in Strasbourg, France (2010, 2011, 2018); the Rhode Island School of Design (RISD) in Providence, Rhode Island, USA, 2016, the École Polytechnique de Paris, France, and the University of California, Davis, USA, in 2019, as well as the Berlin University of the Arts (UDK), Germany, in 2023–2024.

== Awards ==
Agnes Mayer-Brandis has been awarded several prices, among others

- In 2003, 2007, 2011, 2012, 2015, and 2019 several Prix Ars Electronica Awards with Distinction or Honorary Mention
- 2006 transmediale Award First Prize for SGM-Iceberg-Probe
- 2014 Received an Honorary Mention for the CERN Collide Award (fr)
- 2020 European Kairos Prize
- 2026 S+T+ARTS Grand Prize - Innovative Collaboration
